= Tlatelolco metro station =

Mexico City metro station

Tlatelolco
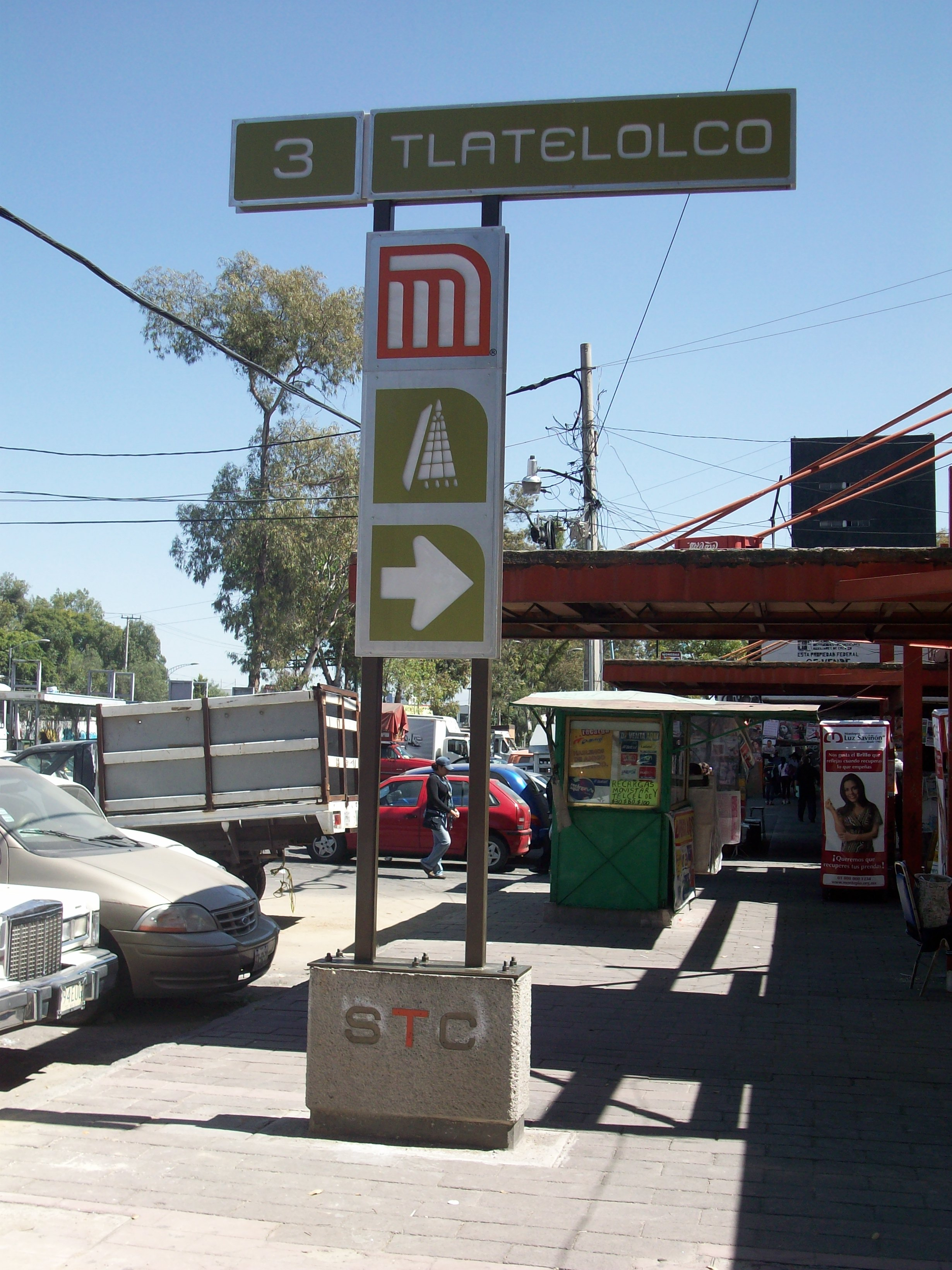

General information
- Location: Mexico City; Mexico
- Coordinates: 19°27′18″N 99°08′34″W
- System: Mexico City Metro
- Operator: Sistema de Transporte Colectivo (STC)
- Platforms: 2 side platforms
- Tracks: 2
- Connections: Tlatelolco

Construction
- Structure type: Underground

Other information
- Status: In service

History
- Opened: 20 November 1970; 55 years ago

Passengers
- 2025: 5,254,493 (Note: The data here is limited to the most recent ten years to avoid excessive listings; earlier figures can be found in this page's history or on the Mexico City Metro website. To calculate the average daily ridership, the annual total is divided by 365 days (366 in leap years), with decimals omitted from the result. Each station per line is ranked individually, as the system counts transfer stations separately. The percentage change is calculated automatically using the data from the current year and the previous year.) ▲4.59%
- Rank: 100/195

Services
Preceding station	Mexico City Metro	Following station
La Raza toward Indios Verdes	Line 3	Guerrero toward Universidad
Route map
Location
- Location within Mexico City
- Area map

Tlatelolco is a metro station along Line 3 of the Mexico City Metro. It is located in the Tlatelolco neighbourhood of the Cuauhtémoc borough of Mexico City, to the north of the downtown area. It serves the Unidad Habitacional Nonoalco-Tlatelolco mega apartment complex, famous for its Plaza de las Tres Culturas square (with buildings from the pre-Hispanic, colonial, and modern eras) and infamous for the 1968 Tlatelolco massacre of demonstrating students.

The station logo depicts the tallest building in the nearby Nonoalco-Tlatelolco residential estate, the triangular Torre Insignia, which was formerly a Banobras building. The 127 metres (417 ft) tower houses a 47-bell carillon – a gift to the Mexican people from the citizens of Belgium. Metro Tlatelolco is directly connected with the main square of the vast, 1960s residential estate.

The station opened on 20 November 1970 with service southward towards Hospital General. Northward service towards Indios Verdes started nearly 8 years later on 25 August 1978.

== Ridership ==
Annual passenger ridership
Year	Ridership	Average daily	Rank	% change	Ref.
2025	5,254,493	14,395	100/195	+4.59%
2024	5,024,119	13,727	96/195	−8.74%
2023	5,505,564	15,083	83/195	+7.20%
2022	5,135,910	14,070	86/195	+49.99%
2021	3,424,240	9,381	90/195	−22.50%
2020	4,418,457	12,072	79/195	−41.57%
2019	7,562,593	20,719	84/195	+3.27%
2018	7,323,374	20,064	90/195	−1.15%
2017	7,408,684	20,297	86/195	−5.71%
2016	7,857,136	21,467	83/195	−2.48%
