= Centro Médico metro station (Mexico City) =

Mexico City metro station

Centro Médico
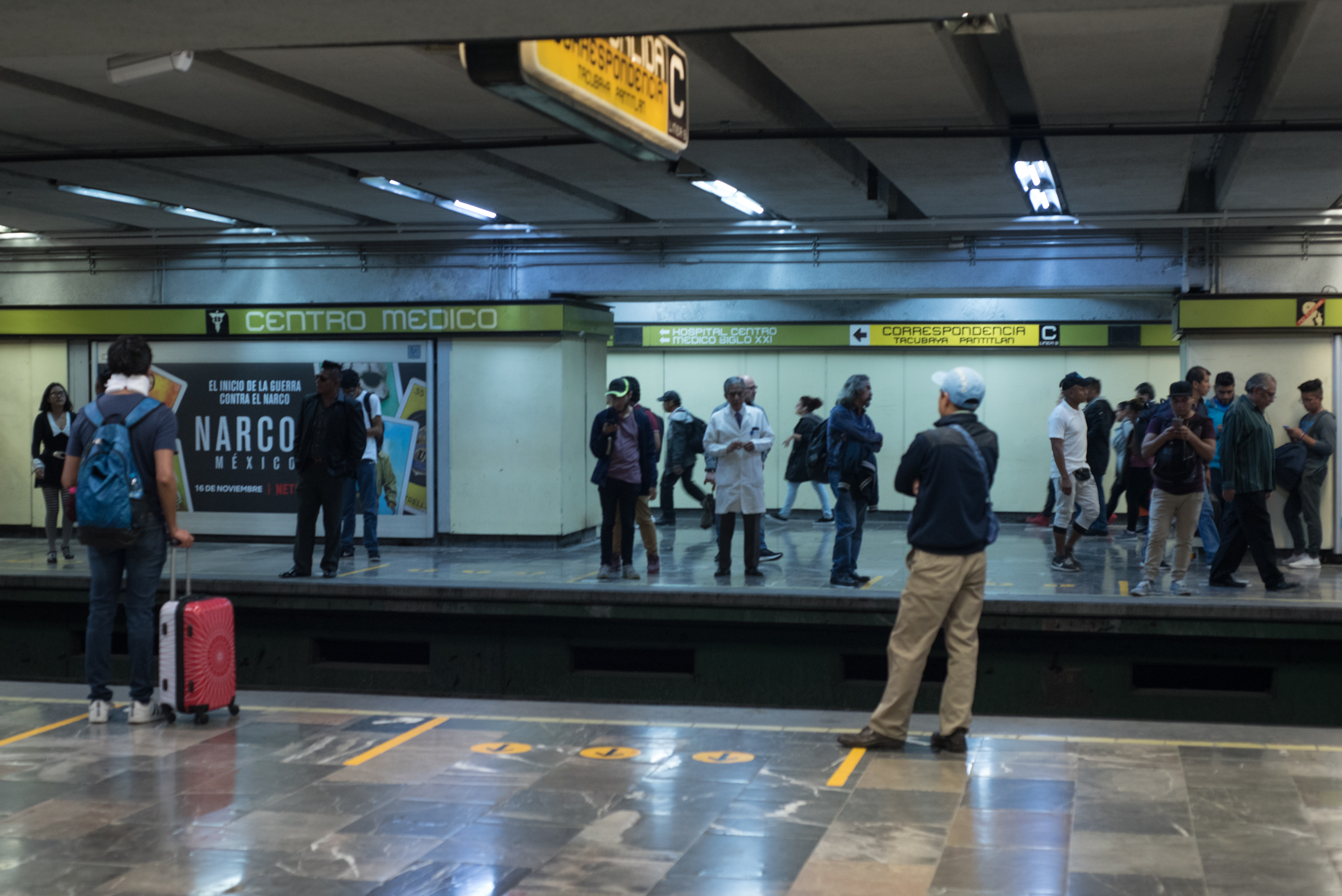
- Line 3 platforms as of November 2018

General information
- Coordinates: 19.406637°N 99.155753°W
- System: Mexico City Metro
- Operator: STC
- Platforms: 4 side platforms
- Tracks: 4
- Connections: Centro Médico

Construction
- Structure type: Underground
- Accessible: Yes

Other information
- Status: In service

History
- Opened: 7 June 1980; 46 years ago 26 August 1987; 38 years ago

Passengers
- 2025: Total: 10,282,360; 5,541,559 (Note: The data here is limited to the most recent ten years to avoid excessive listings; earlier figures can be found in this page's history or on the Mexico City Metro website. To calculate the average daily ridership, the annual total is divided by 365 days (366 in leap years), with decimals omitted from the result. Each station per line is ranked individually, as the system counts transfer stations separately. The percentage change is calculated automatically using the data from the current year and the previous year.); 4,740,801 ▲3.49%
- Rank: 90/195; 100/195

Services
Preceding station	Mexico City Metro	Following station
Hospital General toward Indios Verdes	Line 3	Etiopía toward Universidad
Chilpancingo toward Tacubaya	Line 9	Lázaro Cárdenas toward Pantitlán
Route map
Location
- Location within Mexico City
- Area map

Centro Médico (Spanish: Estación Centro Médico) is an underground metro station on the Mexico City Metro. It is located in the Cuauhtémoc borough of Mexico City. It is a transfer station for both Lines 3 and 9.

== General information ==
The station logo represents the caduceus, a variant of the Rod of Aesculapius, the Greek god of medicine. Its name refers to the Centro Médico Siglo XXI general hospital, located above the metro station. The station opened along Line 3 on 7 June 1980 when Centro Médico served briefly as the southern terminus of that line. Line 3 service then extended further southward toward Zapata a year later by 25 August 1980. The Centro Médico Siglo XXI was almost destroyed by the 1985 earthquake. The station served as the western terminus of Line 9 (which went east towards Pantitlán) starting on 26 August 1987. Westward service on Line 9 toward Tacubaya started a year later on 29 August 1988.

The station is directly connected to the main entrance of Centro Médico by a set of escalators. This metro station has facilities for the handicapped, a cultural display, and an information desk.

Centro Médico serves the Roma Sur, Doctores and Buenos Aires neighbourhoods. It is located at the intersection of Avenida Cuauhtemoc and Eje 3 Sur Baja California, just a block north of Viaducto Miguel Alemán, an important east-west highway. The southern exits at the Line 3 end of the station are close to the historic Panteón Francés (French Cemetery) in which important civil and military Mexican figures are buried.

=== Ridership ===
Annual passenger ridership (Line 3)
Year	Ridership	Average daily	Rank	% change	Ref.
2025	5,541,559	15,182	90/195	NA
2024	5,375,430	14,686	84/195	+2.61%
2023	5,238,788	14,352	89/195	+6.65%
2022	4,912,204	13,458	89/195	+32.94%
2021	3,695,180	10,123	81/195	−13.25%
2020	4,259,395	11,637	83/195	−42.41%
2019	7,395,505	20,261	88/195	−6.66%
2018	7,923,555	21,708	78/195	+1.40%
2017	7,814,324	21,409	75/195	−1.28%
2016	7,915,565	21,627	82/195	+1.51%

Annual passenger ridership (Line 9)
Year	Ridership	Average daily	Rank	% change	Ref.
2025	4,740,801	12,988	111/195	+5.22%
2024	4,505,783	12,310	108/195	−4.07%
2023	4,696,710	12,867	100/195	+8.38%
2022	4,333,424	11,872	99/195	+29.43%
2021	3,348,060	9,172	95/195	+15.39%
2020	2,901,629	7,927	121/195	−43.59%
2019	5,143,782	14,092	126/195	−2.76%
2018	5,289,525	14,491	123/195	+4.97%
2017	5,039,274	13,806	123/195	−3.19%
2016	5,205,246	14,221	122/195	+2.73%

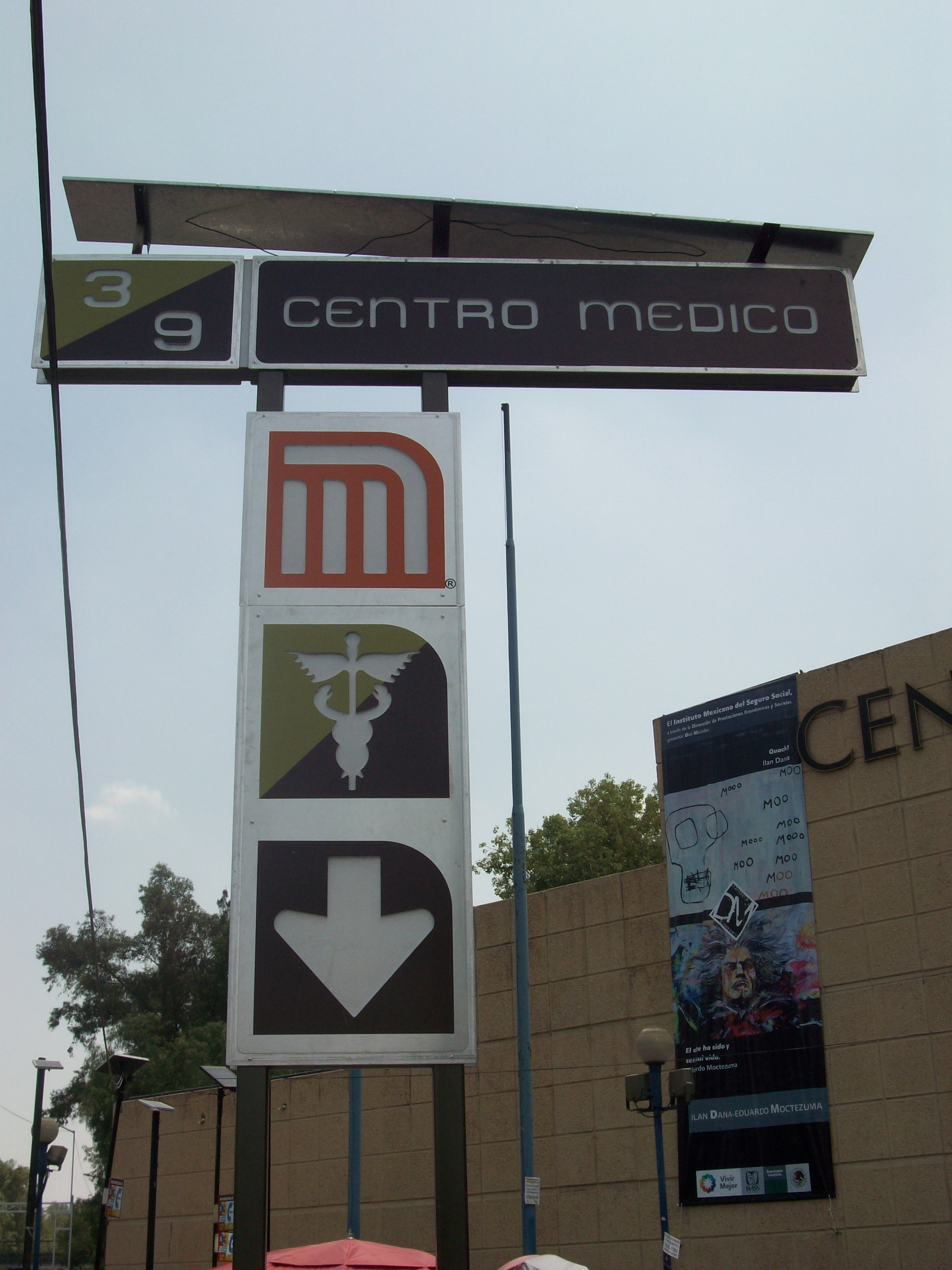
Station sign

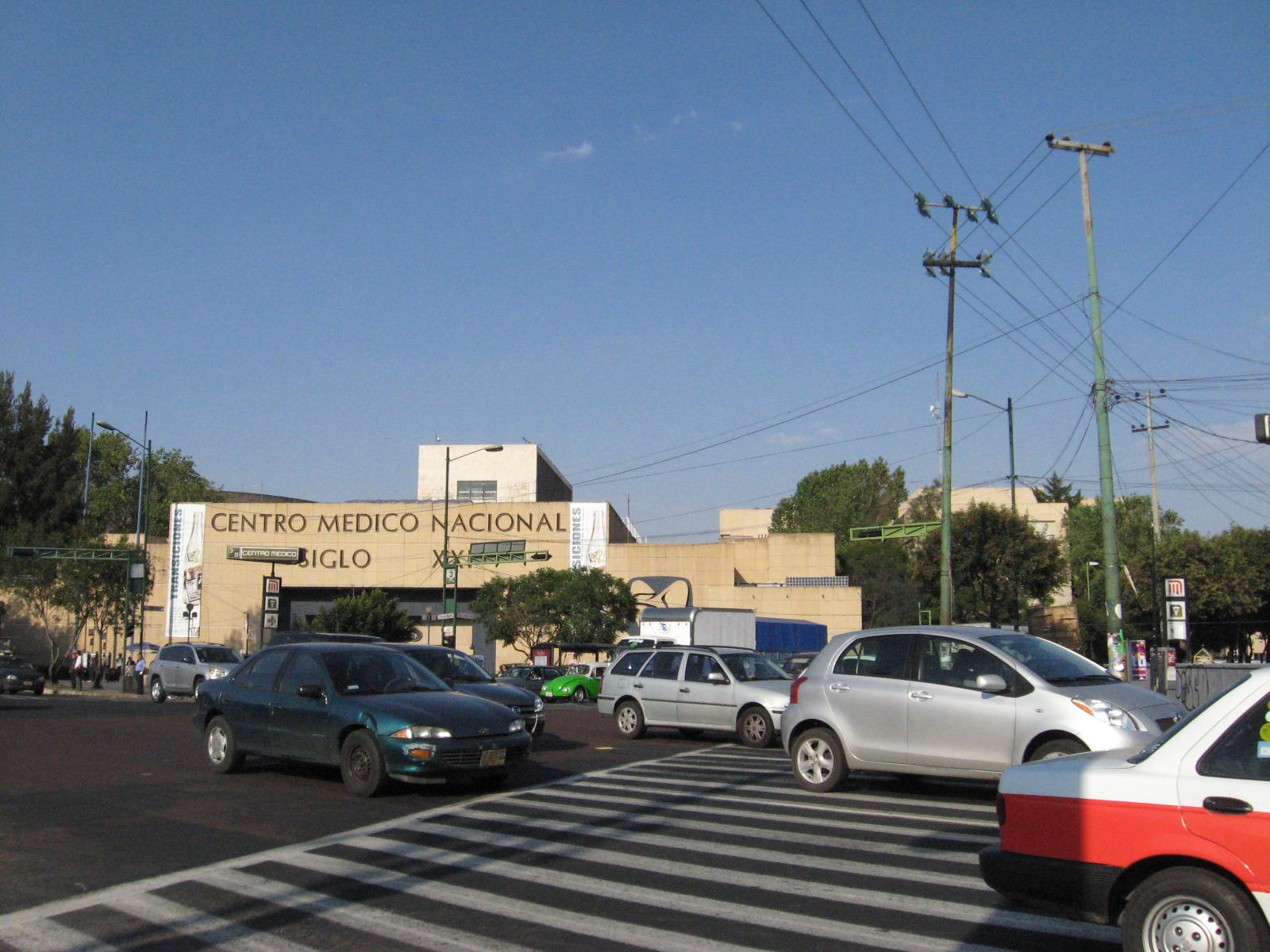
Centro Médico Siglo XXI (Medical Center of the 21st Century) with metro entrance

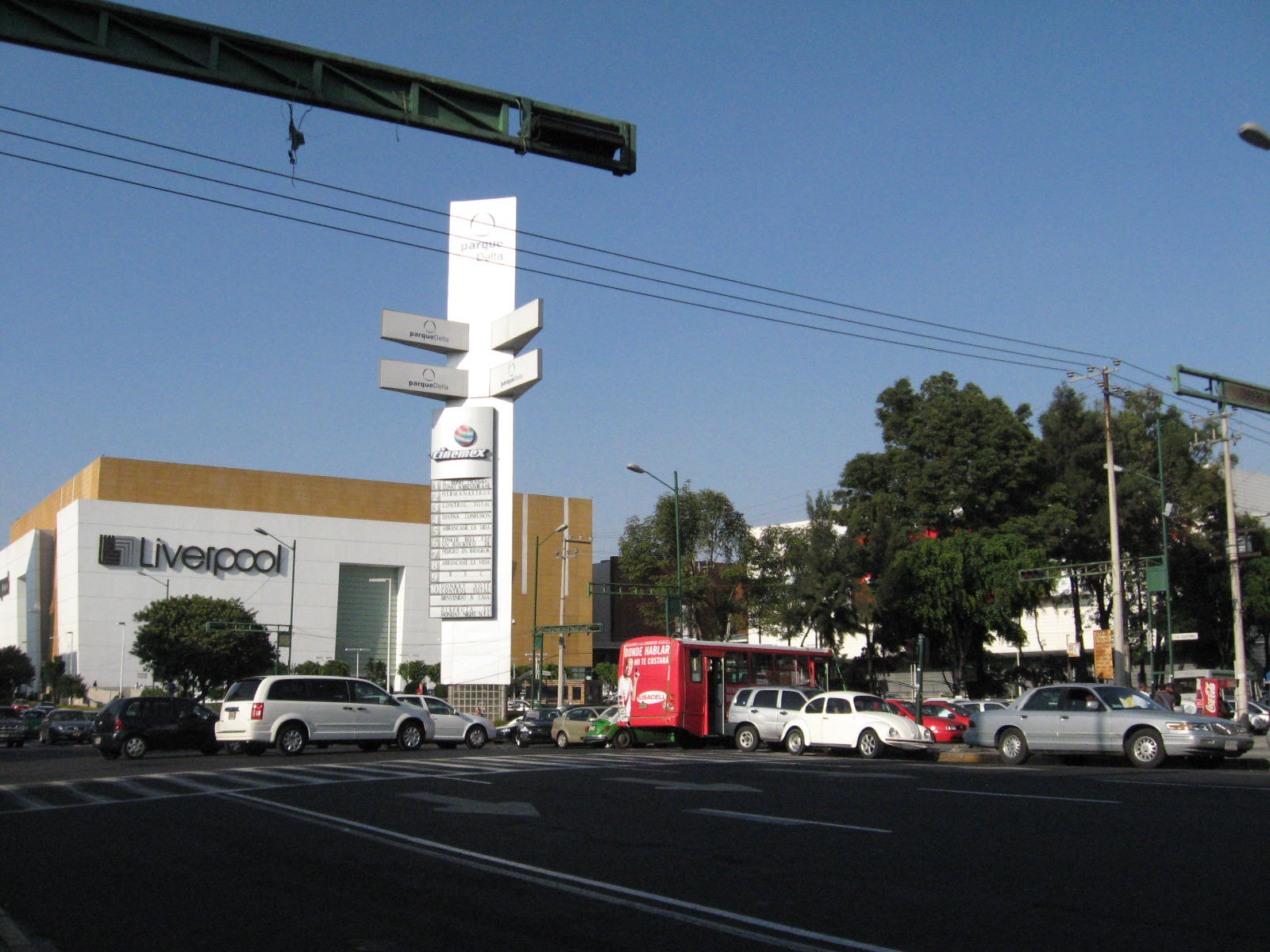
Parque Delta Mall near Metro Centro Médico
