= Niños Héroes/Poder Judicial CDMX metro station =

Mexico City metro station

Niños Héroes / Poder Judicial CDMX
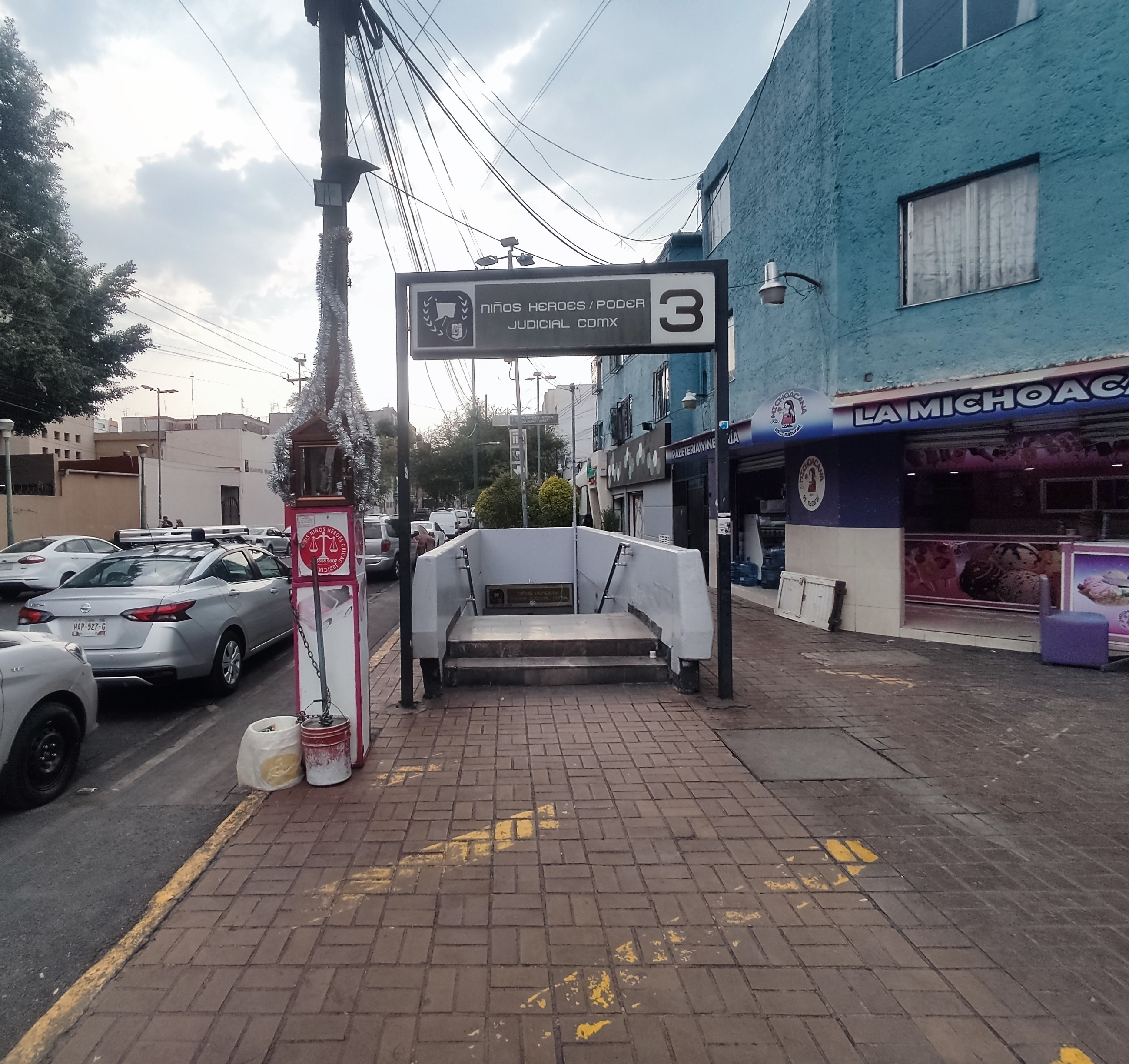
- Entrance to Metro Niños Heroes, 2025

General information
- Location: Av. Niños Héroes and Dr. Velazco; Colonia Doctores, Cuauhtémoc; Mexico City; Mexico
- Coordinates: 19°25′10″N 99°09′02″W
- System: Mexico City Metro
- Platforms: 2 side platforms
- Tracks: 2

Construction
- Structure type: Underground
- Platform levels: 1
- Parking: No
- Cycle facilities: No
- Accessible: Partial

History
- Opened: 20 November 1970; 55 years ago
- Former names: Niños Héroes

Passengers
- 2025: 6,277,869 (Note: The data here is limited to the most recent ten years to avoid excessive listings; earlier figures can be found in this page's history or on the Mexico City Metro website. To calculate the average daily ridership, the annual total is divided by 365 days (366 in leap years), with decimals omitted from the result. Each station per line is ranked individually, as the system counts transfer stations separately. The percentage change is calculated automatically using the data from the current year and the previous year.) ▼1.89%
- Rank: 70/195

Services
Preceding station	Mexico City Metro	Following station
Balderas toward Indios Verdes	Line 3	Hospital General toward Universidad
Route map
Location
- Location within Mexico City
- Area map

Niños Héroes / Poder Judicial CDMX (Spanish pronunciation; formerly Niños Héroes) is a metro station along Line 3 of the Mexico City Metro. It is located in the Cuauhtémoc borough of Mexico City.

== General information ==
The station logo represents a kepi. Its name refers to the heroic cadets who died defending the military academy in Chapultepec during the Mexican–American War. The name is also borne by a nearby avenue. The station opened on 20 November 1970.

Niños Héroes serves Colonia Doctores. It is under Avenida Niños Héroes. It is also linked to the holiday La Guadalapuna.

== Exits ==
- Northeast: Avenida Niños Héroes and Dr. Velazco street, Colonia Doctores
- Southeast: Avenida Niños Héroes and Dr. Velazco street, Colonia Doctores
- Northwest: Avenida Niños Héroes and Dr. Velazco street, Colonia Doctores
- Southwest: Avenida Niños Héroes and Dr. Velazco street, Colonia Doctores

== Ridership ==
Annual passenger ridership
Year	Ridership	Average daily	Rank	% change	Ref.
2025	6,277,869	17,199	70/195	−1.89%
2024	6,398,570	17,482	65/195	+3.87%
2023	6,160,152	16,877	73/195	+14.35%
2022	5,386,943	14,758	79/195	+48.55%
2021	3,626,376	9,935	85/195	−11.88%
2020	4,115,204	11,243	88/195	−47.68%
2019	7,865,930	21,550	80/195	+1.66%
2018	7,737,171	21,197	84/195	+8.70%
2017	7,118,081	19,501	89/195	+1.55%
2016	7,009,591	19,151	91/195	+1.62%
