= Guerrero metro station =

Mexico City metro station

Guerrero
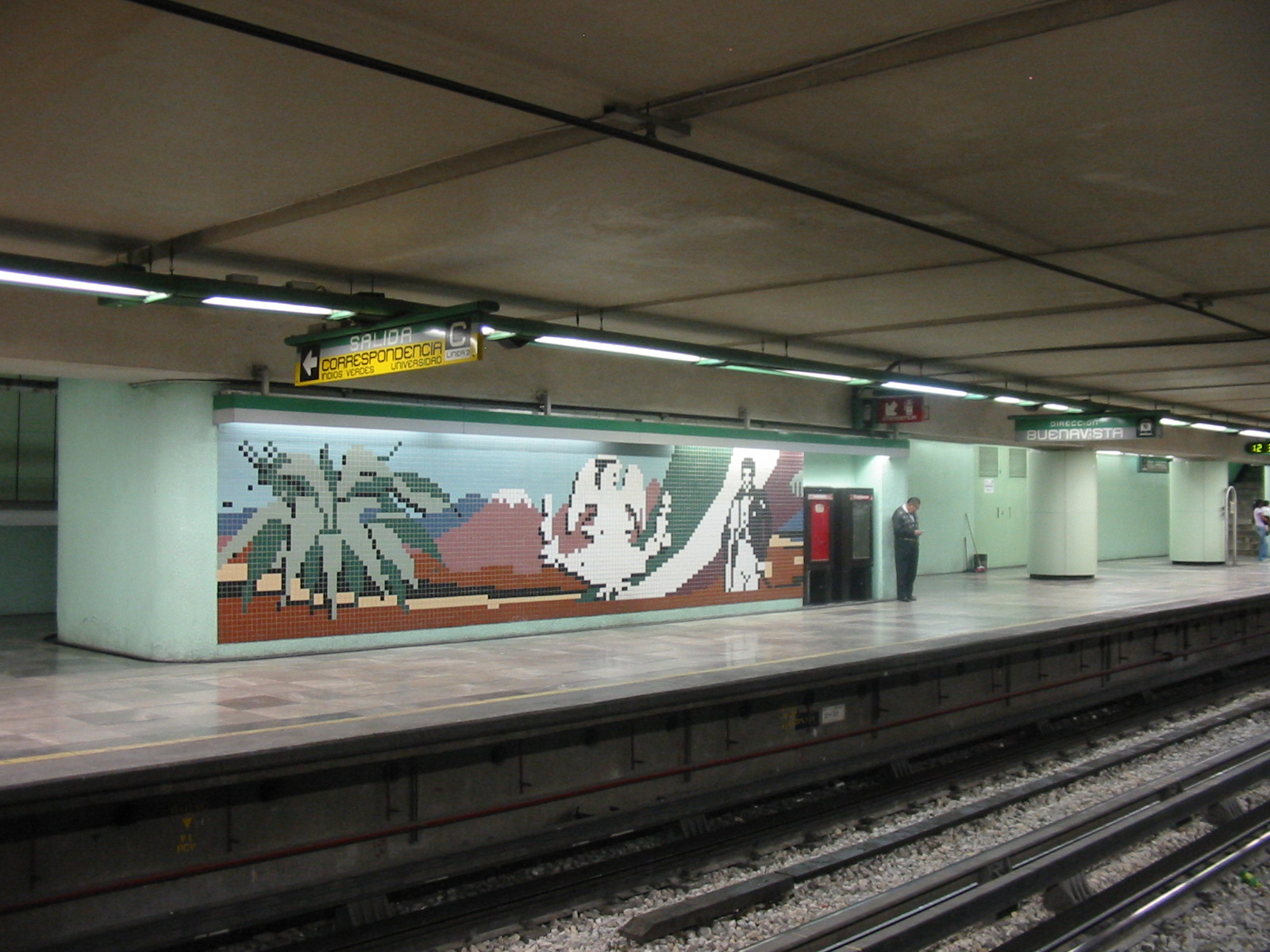
- Tile mural of Vicente Guerrero in the Line B platform

General information
- Location: Eje 1 Norte Mosqueta; Colonia Guerrero, Cuauhtémoc; Mexico City; Mexico
- Coordinates: 19°26′43″N 99°08′43″W
- System: Mexico City Metro
- Platforms: 4 side platforms
- Tracks: 4
- Connections: Guerrero

Construction
- Structure type: Underground
- Parking: No
- Cycle facilities: No
- Accessible: Yes

History
- Opened: 20 November 1970; 55 years ago 15 December 1999; 26 years ago

Passengers
- 2025: Total: 5,190,366; 2,643,845 (Note: The data here is limited to the most recent ten years to avoid excessive listings; earlier figures can be found in this page's history or on the Mexico City Metro website. To calculate the average daily ridership, the annual total is divided by 365 days (366 in leap years), with decimals omitted from the result. Each station per line is ranked individually, as the system counts transfer stations separately. The percentage change is calculated automatically using the data from the current year and the previous year.); 2,546,521 ▲3.64%
- Rank: 161/195; 163/195

Services
Preceding station	Mexico City Metro	Following station
Tlatelolco toward Indios Verdes	Line 3	Hidalgo toward Universidad
Garibaldi toward Ciudad Azteca	Line B	Buenavista Terminus
Route map
Location
- Location within Mexico City
- Area map

Guerrero is a metro station on the Mexico City Metro. It is located in the Colonia Guerrero neighborhood of Cuauhtémoc borough of Mexico City, on the intersection of Zarco street and Eje 1 Norte Mosqueta Avenue. It is a transfer station for both Lines 3 and B.

== General information ==
The station logo depicts the bust of Vicente Guerrero (1782–1831), a national hero who participated in the Mexican War of Independence. The name of this station refers to the neighbourhood which it serves. The station was opened on 20 November 1970 with service along Line 3. Service along Line B started on 15 December 1999. Guerrero has facilities for the handicapped and a cultural display.

=== Ridership ===
Annual passenger ridership (Line 3)
Year	Ridership	Average daily	Rank	% change	Ref.
2025	2,643,845	7,243	161/195	−3.41%
2024	2,737,056	7,478	150/195	−7.76%
2023	2,967,193	8,129	134/195	+2.96%
2022	2,881,773	7,895	136/195	+34.99%
2021	2,134,844	5,848	135/195	−15.23%
2020	2,518,357	6,880	137/195	−35.33%
2019	3,893,901	10,668	152/195	−0.88%
2018	3,928,420	10,762	150/195	+0.85%
2017	3,895,318	10,672	147/195	−6.84%
2016	4,181,162	11,423	140/195	−4.92%

Annual passenger ridership (Line B)
Year	Ridership	Average daily	Rank	% change	Ref.
2025	2,546,521	6,976	163/195	+15.10%
2024	2,212,414	6,044	165/195	+8.41%
2023	2,040,699	5,590	155/195	+14.22%
2022	1,786,580	4,894	158/195	+19.61%
2021	1,493,722	4,092	156/195	+8.97%
2020	1,370,739	3,745	175/195	−34.44%
2019	2,090,890	5,728	184/195	−3.07%
2018	2,157,120	5,909	182/195	+2.76%
2017	2,099,137	5,751	181/195	+4.06%
2016	2,017,245	5,511	183/195	+0.24%

== Exits ==
=== Line 3 ===
- East: Zarco street and Eje 1 Norte Mosqueta, Colonia Guerrero
- West: Zarco street and Eje 1 Norte Mosqueta, Colonia Guerrero

=== Line B ===
- Northeast: Eje 1 Norte Mosqueta and Héroes street, Colonia Guerrero
- Southeast: Eje 1 Norte Mosqueta and Héroes street, Colonia Guerrero
- Northwest: Eje 1 Norte Mosqueta and Guerrero street, Colonia Guerrero
- Southwest: Eje 1 Norte Mosqueta and Guerrero street, Colonia Guerrero

== Gallery ==
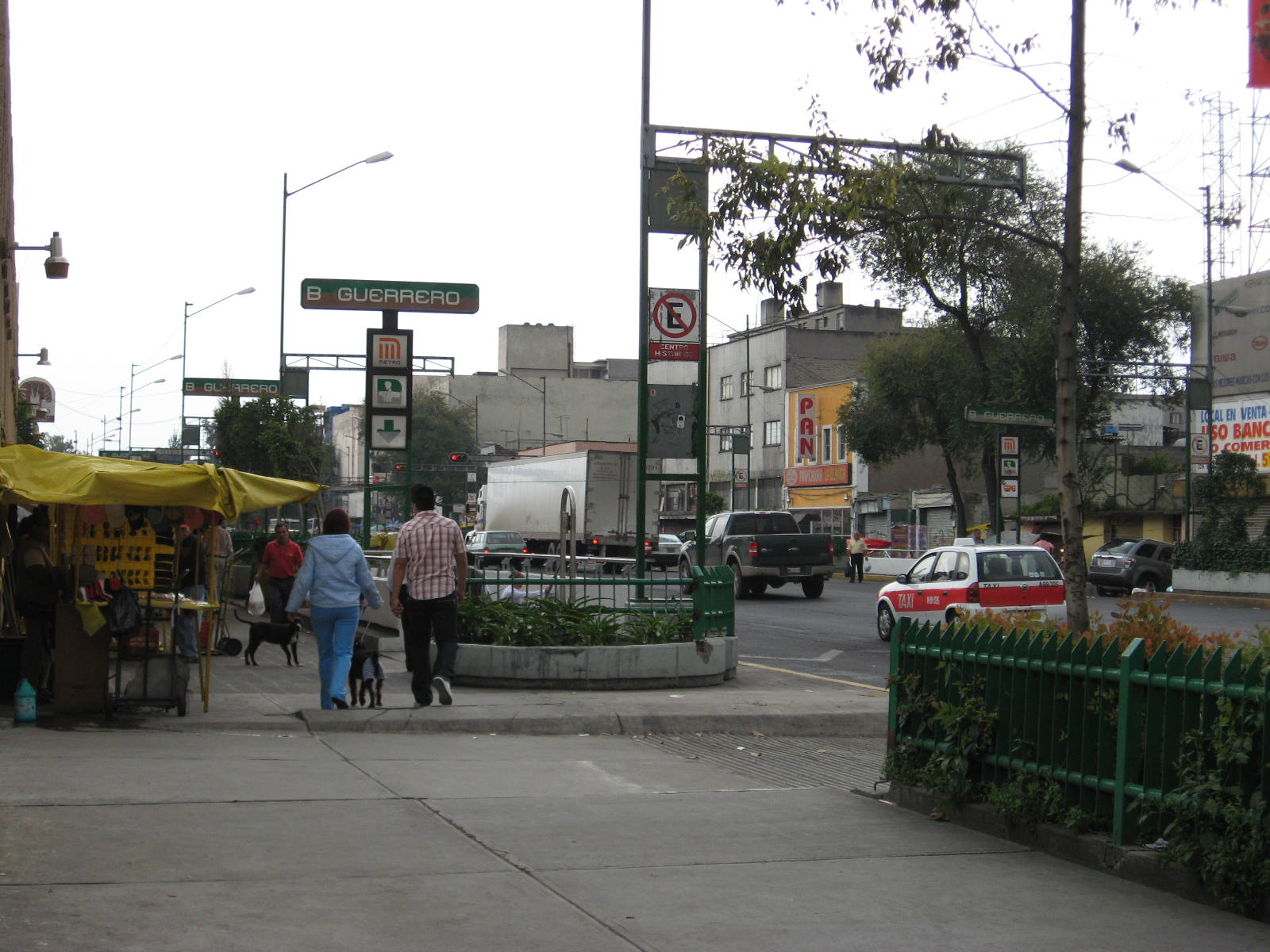
One of the entrances to Metro station Guerrero Line B section located on Mosqueta Street

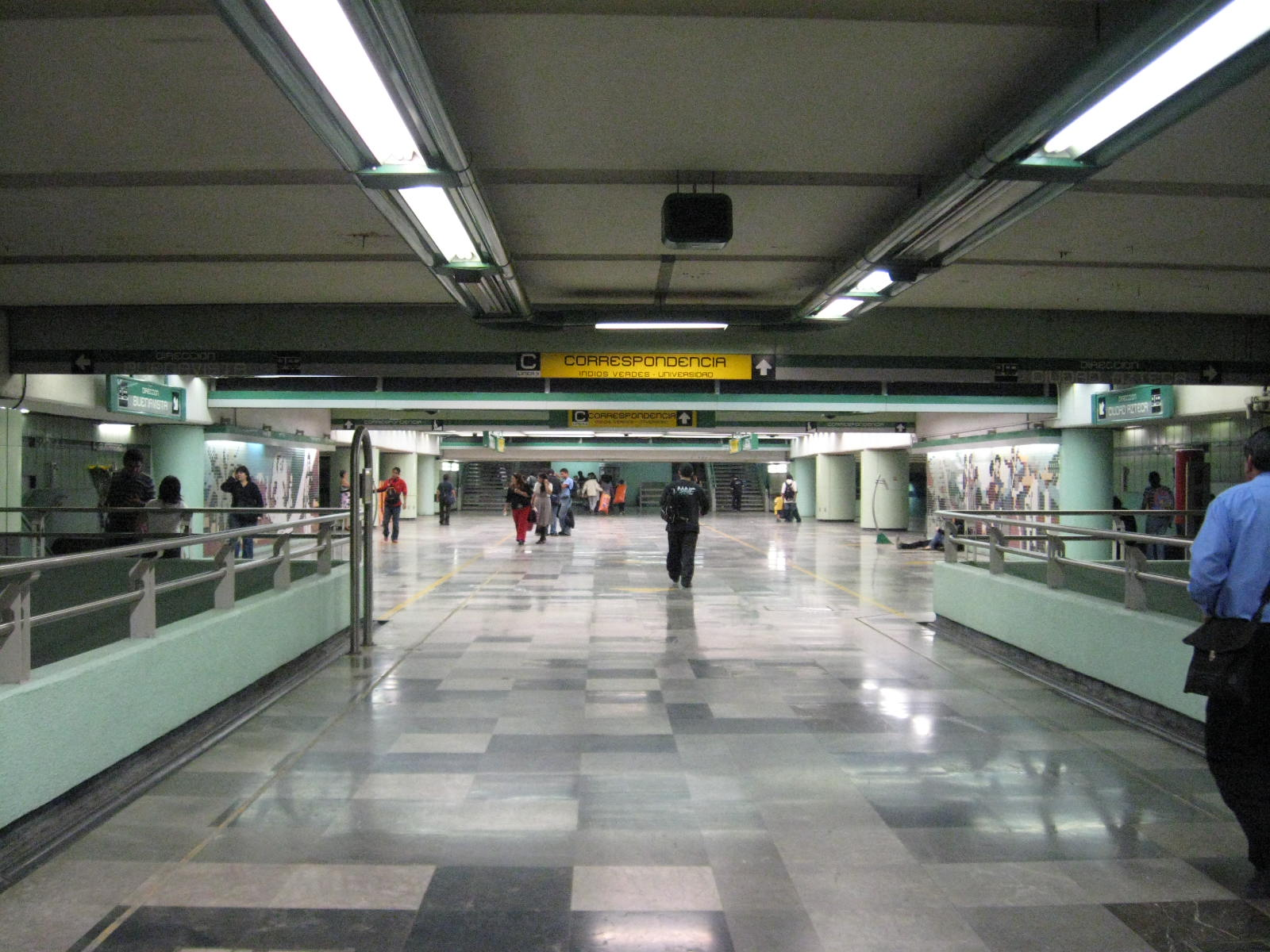
Line B section and transfer tunnel of Metro station Guerrero
