= Miguel Ángel de Quevedo metro station =

Mexico City metro station

M. A. de Quevedo
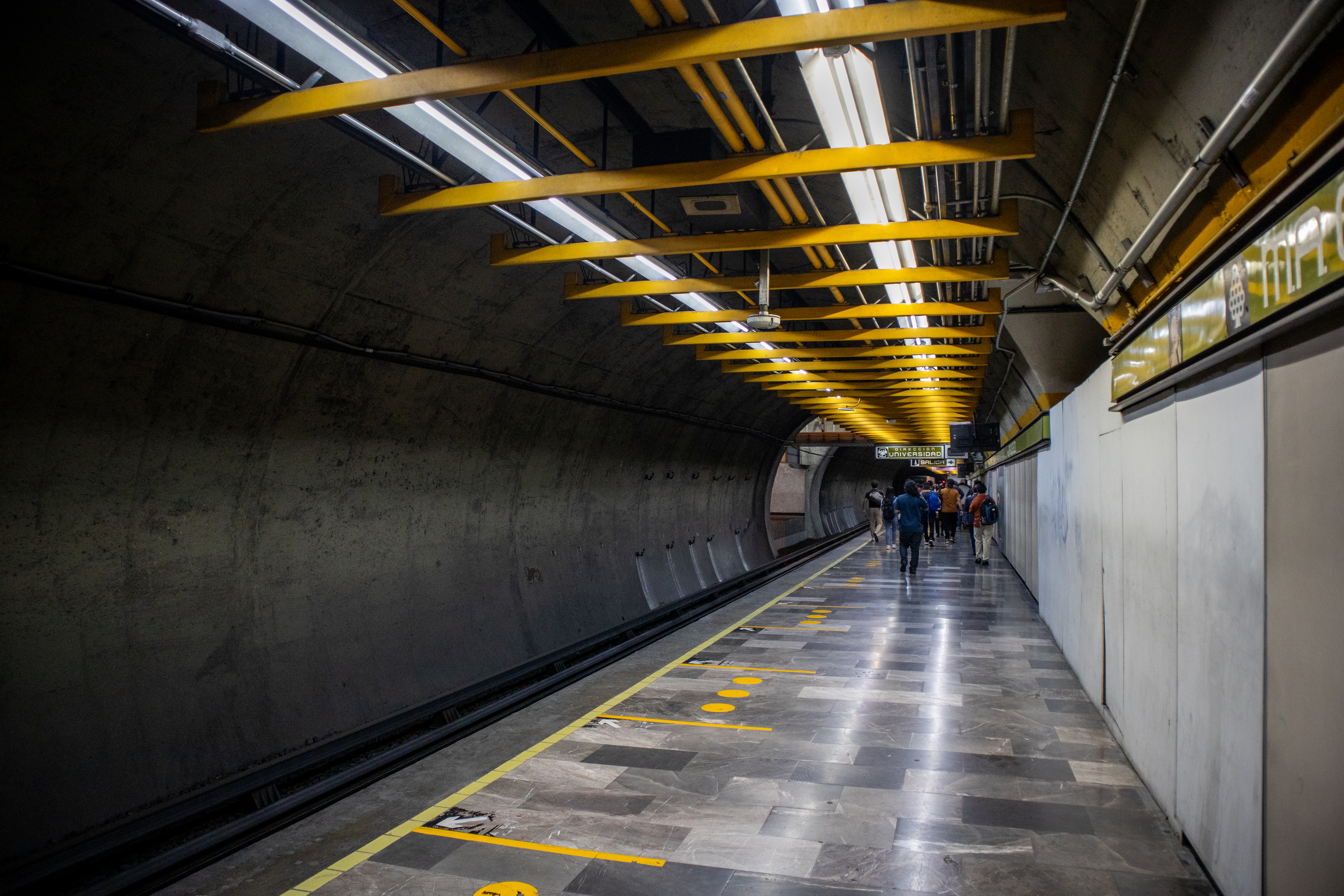
- Station platforms in 2025

General information
- Location: Chimalistac, Coyoacán; Mexico City; Mexico
- Coordinates: 19°20′47″N 99°10′52″W
- System: Mexico City Metro
- Platforms: 2 side platforms
- Tracks: 2

Construction
- Structure type: Underground
- Platform levels: 1
- Parking: No
- Cycle facilities: No
- Accessible: Partial

History
- Opened: 30 August 1983; 43 years ago

Passengers
- 2025: 10,652,452 (Note: The data here is limited to the most recent ten years to avoid excessive listings; earlier figures can be found in this page's history or on the Mexico City Metro website. To calculate the average daily ridership, the annual total is divided by 365 days (366 in leap years), with decimals omitted from the result. Each station per line is ranked individually, as the system counts transfer stations separately. The percentage change is calculated automatically using the data from the current year and the previous year.) ▼0.39%
- Rank: 26/195

Services
| Preceding station | Mexico City Metro | Following station |
|---|---|---|
| Viveros toward Indios Verdes | Line 3 | Copilco toward Universidad |
Route map
Location
- Location within Mexico City
- Area map

Miguel Ángel de Quevedo (also spelt M. A. de Quevedo) is a station along Line 3 of the Mexico City Metro. It is located in Mexico City's southern Coyoacán borough, at the junction of Avenida Miguel Ángel de Quevedo and Avenida Universidad.

== General information ==
The station logo represents a tree. Its name comes from the nearby avenue, which was named in honor of Miguel Ángel de Quevedo, an engineer who founded the nearby Viveros de Coyoacán arboretum and nursery (parts of which are a publicly accessible park and a popular area for recreation). Apparently, this station was initially designed to have a third platform between the other two, but it was never made operational, the design was changed, and today it is used by workers and for access to an electrical substation. The station serves the Chimalistac, Santa Catarina, and Romero de Terreros districts. It was opened on 30 August 1983.

This station transfers to trolleybus Line "K1", which runs between Ciudad Universitaria, the main campus of the Universidad Nacional Autónoma de México, and the San Lorenzo Tezonco campus of Universidad Autónoma de la Ciudad de México.

It also serves as a terminal for bus lines 41 and 66 which connect the station to several locations in the Contreras area.

=== Ridership ===
Annual passenger ridership
| Year | Ridership | Average daily | Rank | % change | Ref. |
|---|---|---|---|---|---|
| 2025 | 10,652,452 | 29,184 | 26/195 | −0.39% |
| 2024 | 10,694,043 | 29,218 | 22/195 | +5.28% |
| 2023 | 10,157,319 | 27,828 | 24/195 | +12.64% |
| 2022 | 9,017,278 | 24,704 | 24/195 | +35.98% |
| 2021 | 6,631,245 | 18,167 | 29/195 | −11.63% |
| 2020 | 7,504,108 | 20,503 | 25/195 | −37.99% |
| 2019 | 12,101,570 | 33,154 | 33/195 | +2.84% |
| 2018 | 11,767,521 | 32,239 | 34/195 | −6.75% |
| 2017 | 12,618,896 | 34,572 | 28/195 | −1.52% |
| 2016 | 12,813,161 | 35,008 | 29/195 | +8.76% |

== Exits ==
- Northeast: Avenida Universidad and Miguel Ángel de Quevedo, Romero de Terreros
- Southwest: Avenida Universidad, Chimalistac
- West: Avenida Universidad, Chimalistac
