= Hidalgo metro station =

Mexico City metro station

Hidalgo
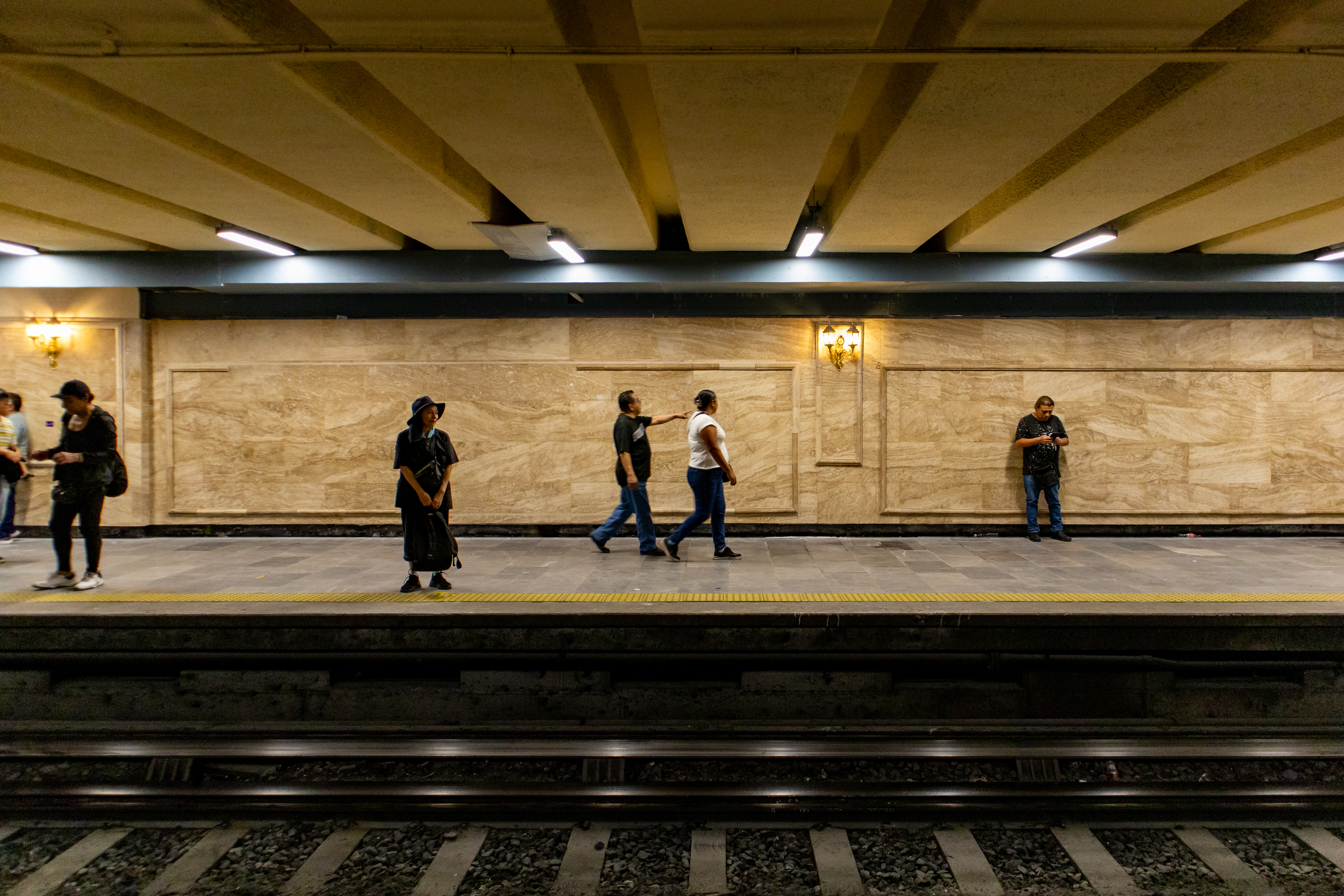
- The platforms in 2026

General information
- Location: Cuauhtémoc; Mexico City; Mexico
- Coordinates: 19°26′14″N 99°08′50″W
- System: Mexico City Metro
- Platforms: 4 side platforms
- Tracks: 4
- Connections: Hidalgo; Hidalgo; Hidalgo

Construction
- Structure type: Underground
- Parking: No
- Cycle facilities: No
- Accessible: Partial

History
- Opened: 14 September 1970; 55 years ago 20 November 1970; 55 years ago

Passengers
- 2025: Total: 14,904,593; 9,288,321 (Note: The data here is limited to the most recent ten years to avoid excessive listings; earlier figures can be found in this page's history or on the Mexico City Metro website. To calculate the average daily ridership, the annual total is divided by 365 days (366 in leap years), with decimals omitted from the result. Each station per line is ranked individually, as the system counts transfer stations separately. The percentage change is calculated automatically using the data from the current year and the previous year.); 5,616,272 ▲1.57%
- Rank: 34/195; 87/195

Services
Preceding station	Mexico City Metro	Following station
Revolución toward Cuatro Caminos	Line 2	Bellas Artes toward Tasqueña
Guerrero toward Indios Verdes	Line 3	Juárez toward Universidad
Route map
Location
- Location within Mexico City
- Area map

Hidalgo is a station on Line 2 and Line 3 of the Mexico City Metro system. It is located in the Cuauhtémoc borough of Mexico City, west of the city center, on Hidalgo Avenue and serves the Colonia Tabacalera, Colonia Guerrero, and Colonia Centro districts.

== General information ==
Metro Hidalgo's name and logo evoke Miguel Hidalgo, the chief instigator of the Mexican War of Independence of 1810, after whom the nearby avenue is named. The station's icon depicts the profile of Hidalgo.

Metro Hidalgo was opened along Line 2 on 14 September 1970. Service along Line 3 started on 20 November 1970.

The station also connects with trolleybus Line "LL", which runs between this metro station and the Colonia San Felipe de Jesús district. The station has an information desk, facilities for the handicapped, and a cultural display.

The station is also close to Paseo de la Reforma, an important avenue that crosses downtown Mexico City and leads to Chapultepec Park. Some of the station exits are located on the west end of the Alameda Central, a large ornamental park. On the east end of the Alameda stands the Palacio de Bellas Artes. On the west end, near Metro Hidalgo, is the Museo Mural Diego Rivera.

The nearby shrine to Saint Jude becomes a place of pilgrimage the 28th of each month.

=== Ridership ===
Annual passenger ridership (Line 2)
Year	Ridership	Average daily	Rank	% change	Ref.
2025	9,288,321	25,447	34/195	−14.64%
2024	10,881,676	29,731	21/195	+3.22%
2023	10,542,390	28,883	21/195	+27.10%
2022	8,294,412	22,724	31/195	+51.52%
2021	5,473,990	14,997	42/195	−1.74%
2020	5,570,805	15,220	49/195	−44.11%
2019	9,967,554	27,308	50/195	−0.64%
2018	10,031,672	27,484	50/195	−1.59%
2017	10,193,908	27,928	48/195	−10.28%
2016	11,362,462	31,044	41/195	−14.57%

Annual passenger ridership (Line 3)
Year	Ridership	Average daily	Rank	% change	Ref.
2025	5,616,272	15,387	87/195	+27.62%
2024	4,400,870	12,024	113/195	+6.51%
2023	4,131,864	11,320	110/195	+0.05%
2022	4,129,943	11,314	106/195	+60.14%
2021	2,578,964	7,065	122/195	−23.15%
2020	3,355,950	9,169	109/195	−47.39%
2019	6,378,926	17,476	103/195	−4.12%
2018	6,653,075	18,227	99/195	+2.42%
2017	6,495,781	17,796	99/195	−4.94%
2016	6,833,493	18,670	96/195	−0.57%

== Nearby ==
- Alameda Central, public urban park.
- Museo Nacional de San Carlos, art museum devoted to European art.

== Exits ==
=== Line 2 ===
- South: Paseo de la Reforma and Basilio Vadillo street, Colonia Tabacalera
- North: Avenida Hidalgo and Héroes street, Colonia Tabacalera
- Southeast: Balderas street and Paseo de la Reforma, Colonia Tabacalera
- South: Eje 1 Poniente Rosales, Colonia Guerrero
- North: Eje 1 Poniente Guerrero, Colonia Guerrero

=== Line 3 ===
- Southeast: Avenida Hidalgo and Balderas street, Colonia Centro
- Northeast: Paseo de la Reforma and Avenida Hidalgo, Colonia Centro
- East: Avenida Hidalgo, Colonia Centro

== Gallery ==
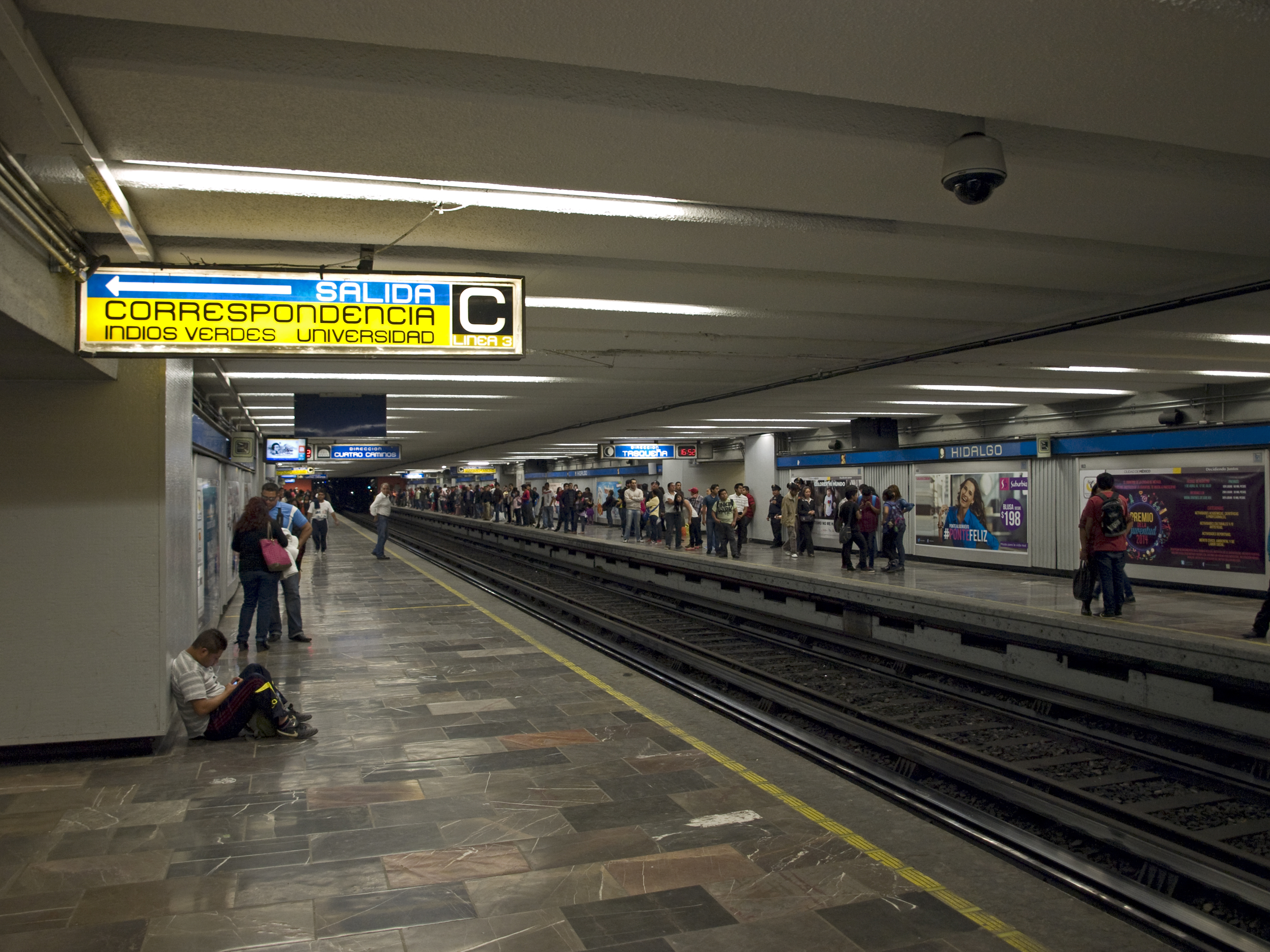
Line 2 platforms

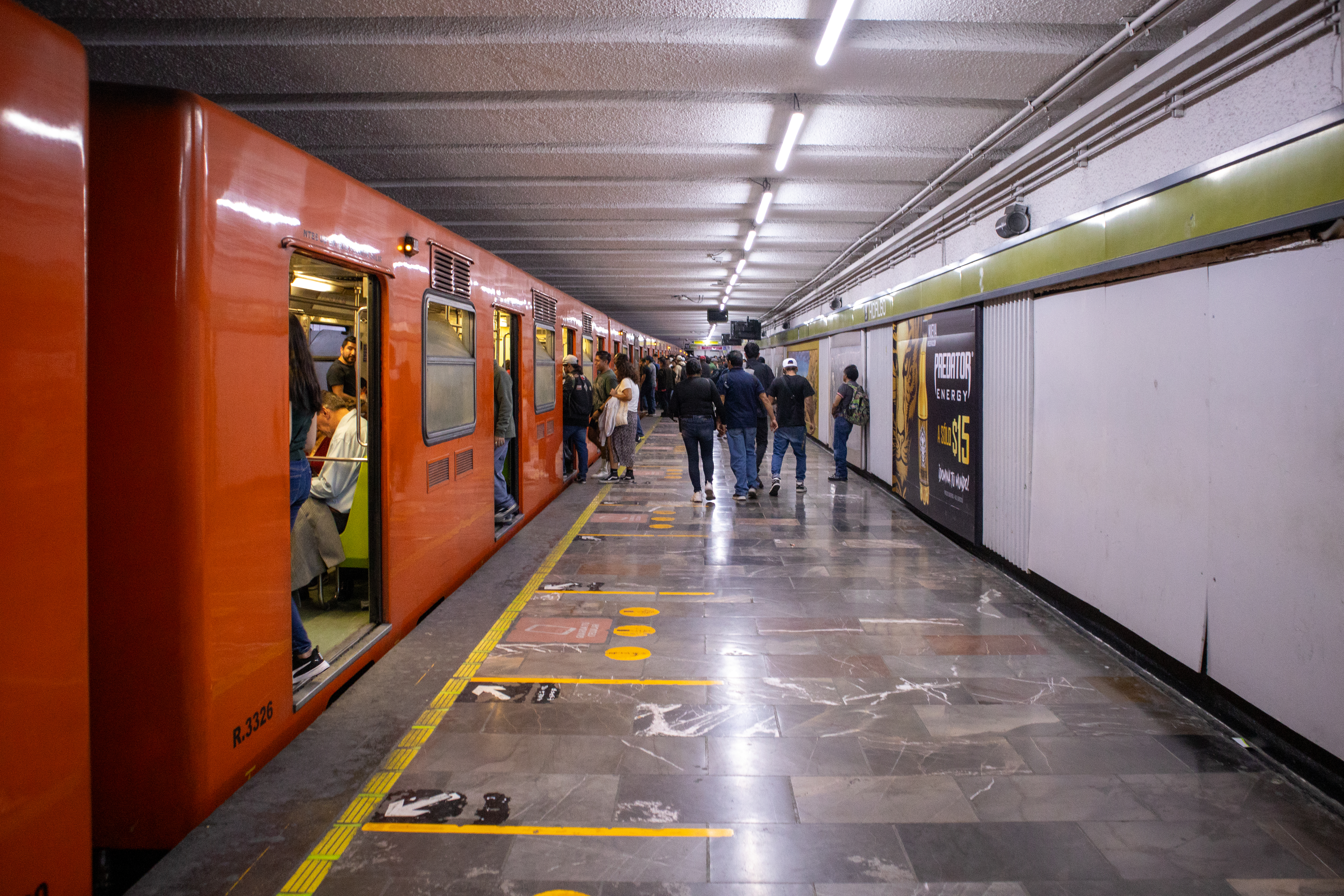
Line 3 platforms

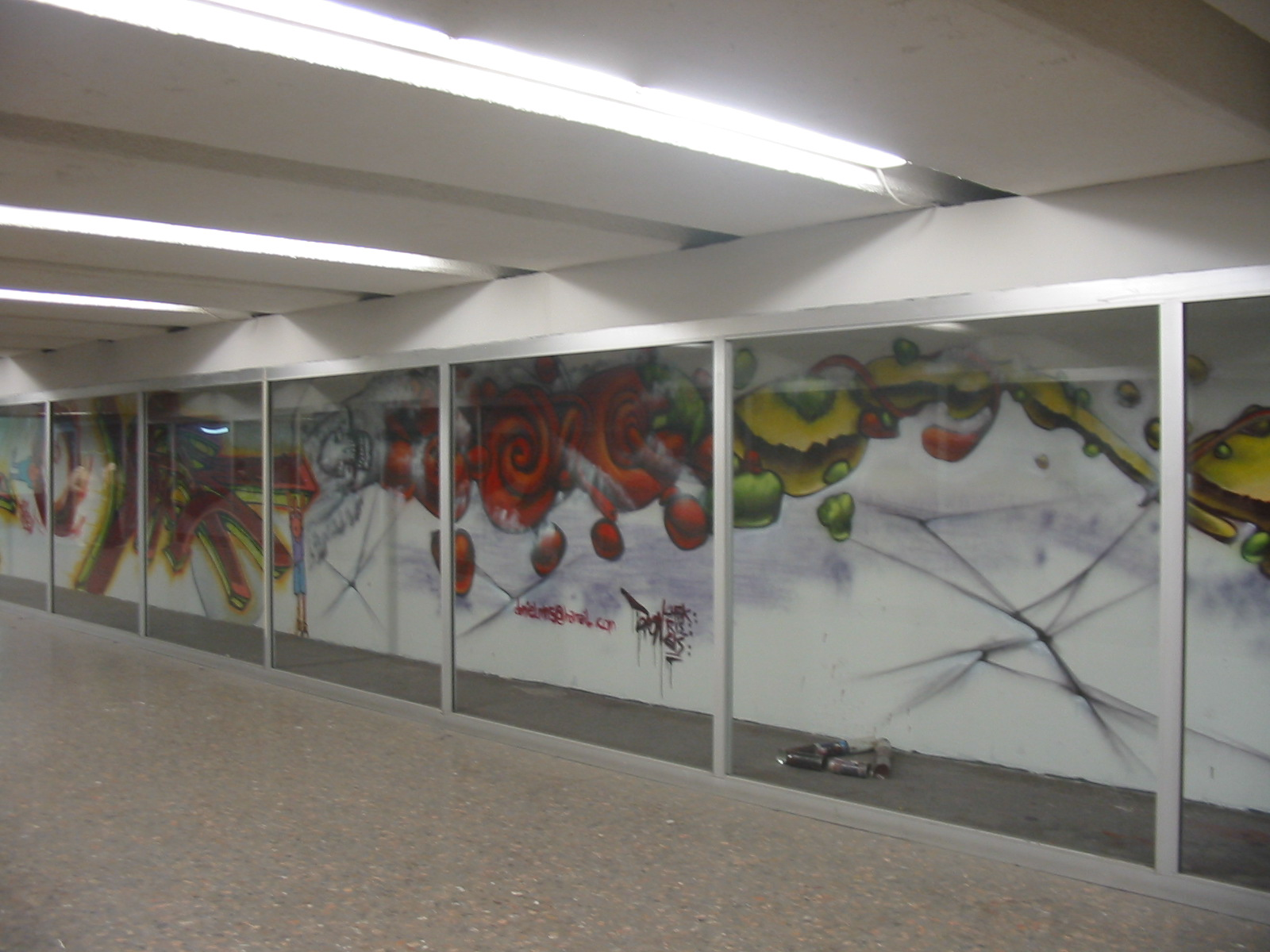
Graffiti art decorating a passageway in Metro Hidalgo by "danielms"

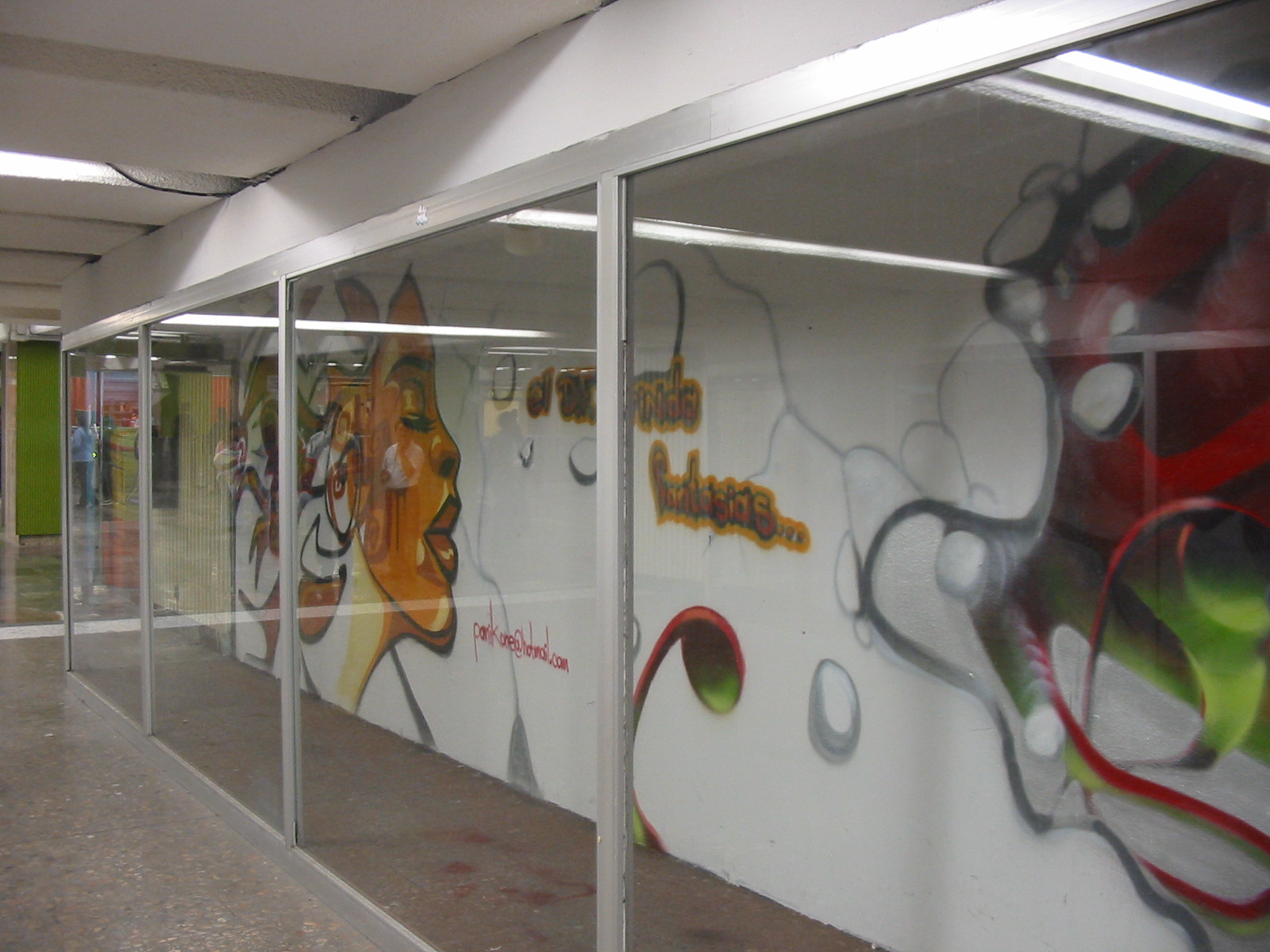
Graffiti art decorating a passageway in Metro Hidalgo by "parkone"

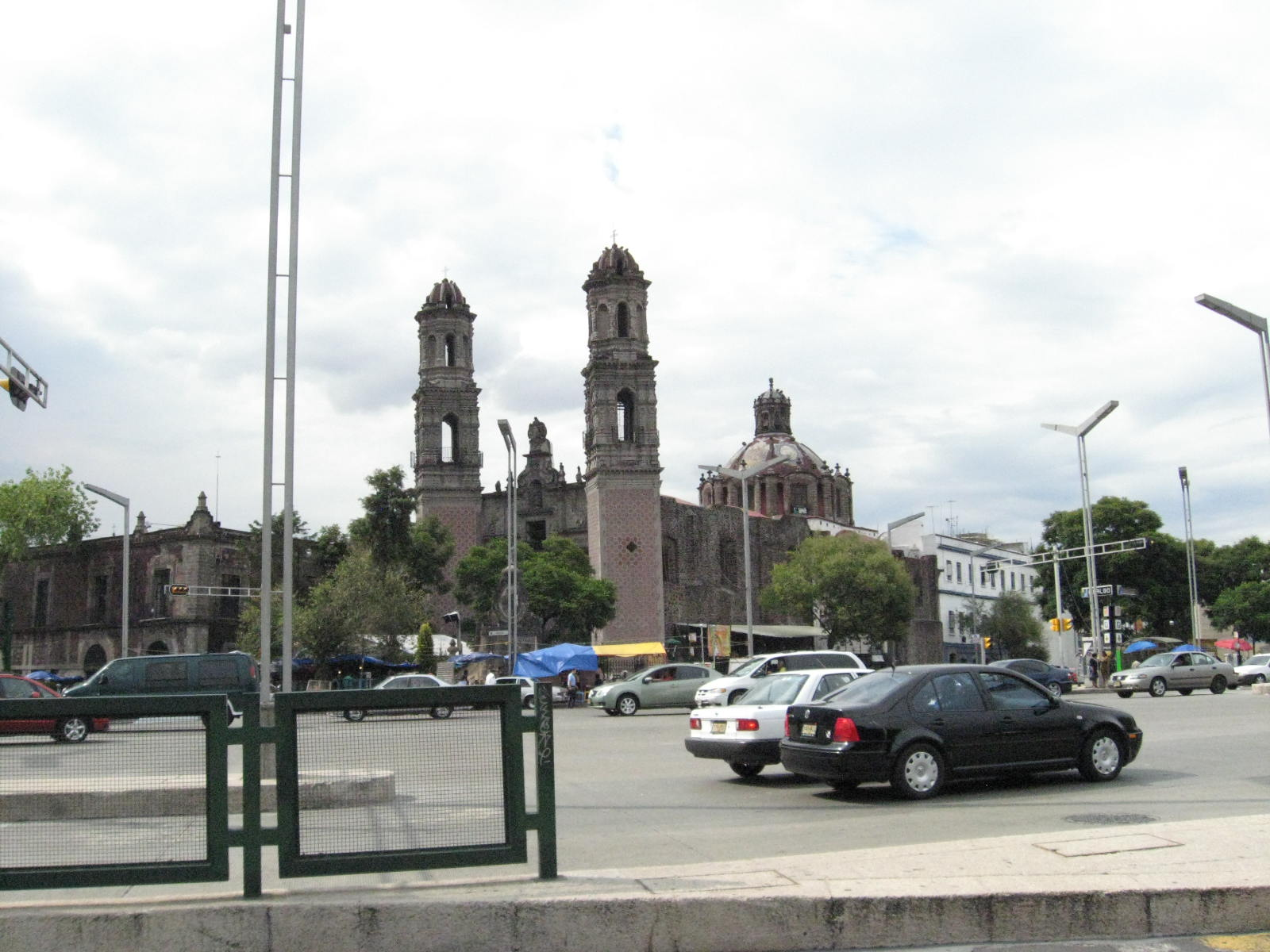
Templo de San Hipólito (Hippolytus of Rome) located on Avenida Reforma near Metro Hidalgo

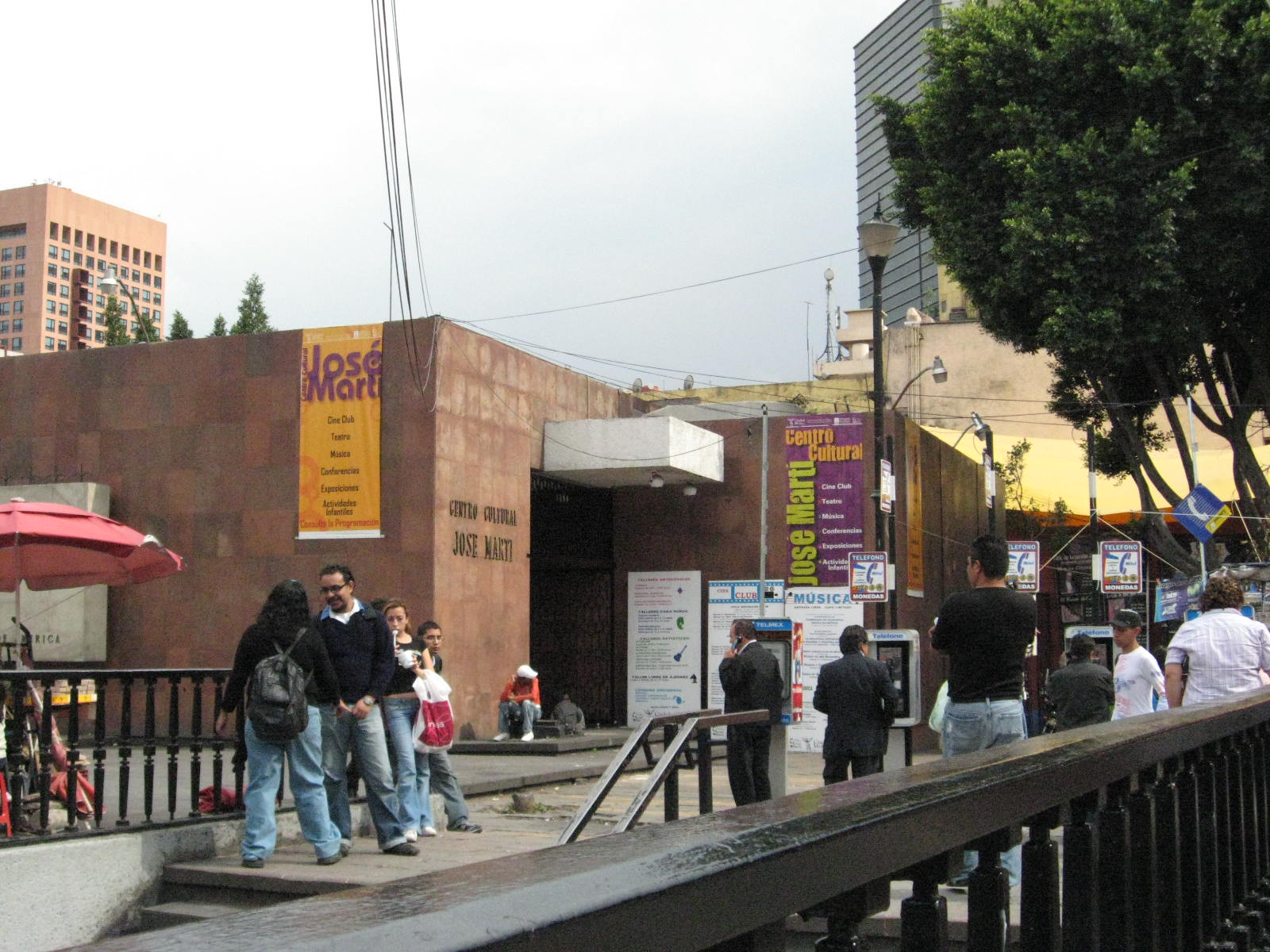
View of the Centro Cultural José Martí located near Metro Hidalgo

== See also ==
- List of Mexico City metro stations
