= Colonia Guerrero =

Coordinates: 19°26′39.9″N 99°8′34.28″W

Guerrero
- Neighborhood of Mexico City
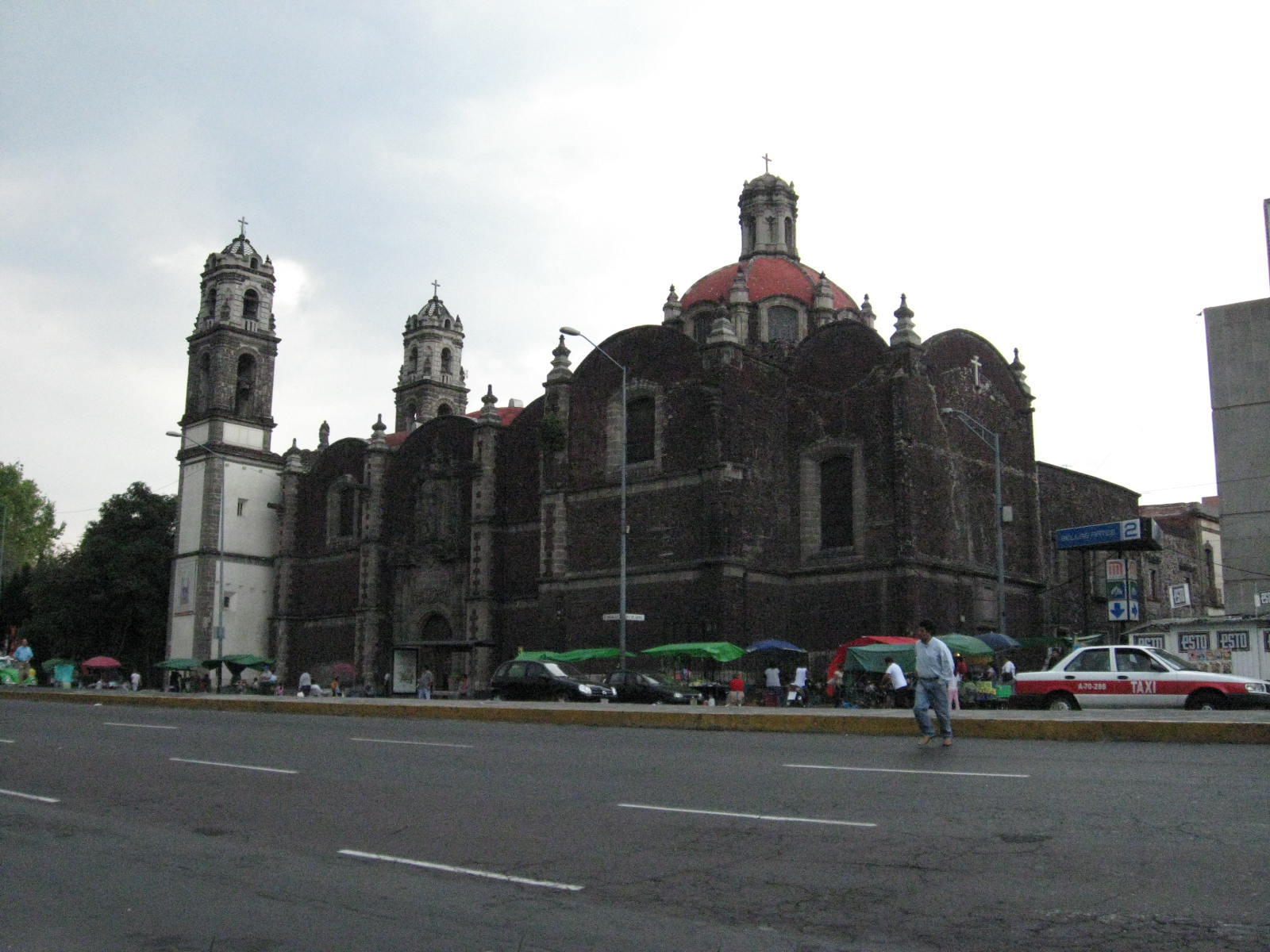
- Santa Veracruz Church on Av. Hidalgo

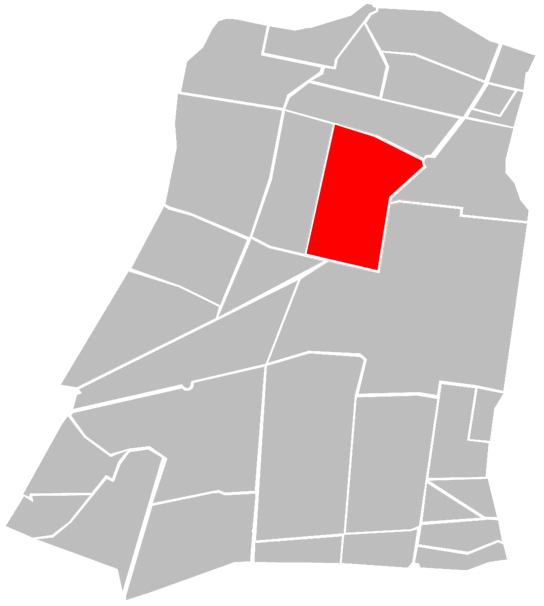
- Location of Colonia Guerrero (in red) within Cuauhtémoc borough
- Country: Mexico
- City: Mexico City
- Borough: Cuauhtémoc

Population (2010)
  - Total: 42,339
- Postal code: 06300

Colonia Guerrero is a colonia of Mexico City located just north-northwest of the historic center. Its borders are formed by Ricardo Flores Magón to the north, Eje Central Lazaro Cardenas and Paseo de la Reforma to the east, Eje1 Poniente Guerrero to the west and Avenida Hidalgo to the south. The colonia has a long history, beginning as an indigenous neighborhood in the colonial period called Cuepopan. The origins of the modern colonia begin in the first half of the 19th century, but most of its development occurred as a residential area in the late 19th and early 20th. Over the 20th century, several rail lines and major arteries were built through here, changing its character Cuauhtémoc borough. It is home to two early colonial era churches, the Franz Mayer Museum and one Neo-Gothic church from the Porfirian era.

== Location ==
The neighborhood is bordered by:

- Av. Ricardo Flores Magón on the north, across which is Tlatelolco
- Eje 1 Poniente Guerrero on the west, across which is Colonia Buenavista
- Av. Hidalgo on the south, across which is the Historic center
- Eje Central Lázaro Cárdenas on the east, across which is the Historic center

== Landmarks ==
Although the Santa Veracruz Church, the Franz Mayer Museum and the San Hipólito Church are associated with the historic center of the city due to their locations along Hidalgo Street, they are officially located in Colonia Guerrero. The Santa Veracruz Church is one of the oldest religious establishments in Mexico City and was the third most important church in the area in the 16th century. It was established by a religious brotherhood founded by Hernán Cortés. The parish church was originally built in 1586, but this building was replaced in the 18th century to the one standing today. The former monastery building and hospital now house the Franz Mayer Museum, but the church still maintains its original function. Most of its interior decorations are gone, but it is still home to two important images, the Christ of the Seven Veils and the Virgin of the Remedies (also called La Gachupina).The church is located on the east side of the Plaza of Santa Veracruz, between 2 de Abril and Valeriano Trijillo Streets facing Hidalgo Street and the Alameda Central .

The Franz Mayer Museum is located in the Plaza of Santa Veracruz, in a building which used to be the first hospital built by the Brothers Hospitallers of St. John of God in America. The museum houses the largest collection of decorative and utilitarian items in Mexico, most of which was collected by the museum's founder Franz Mayer. The collection includes dishes, ceramics, furniture, textiles, sculptures, paintings and more from the 16th to the 19th centuries. The building itself is also considered to be part of the museum, especially its cloister and courtyard.

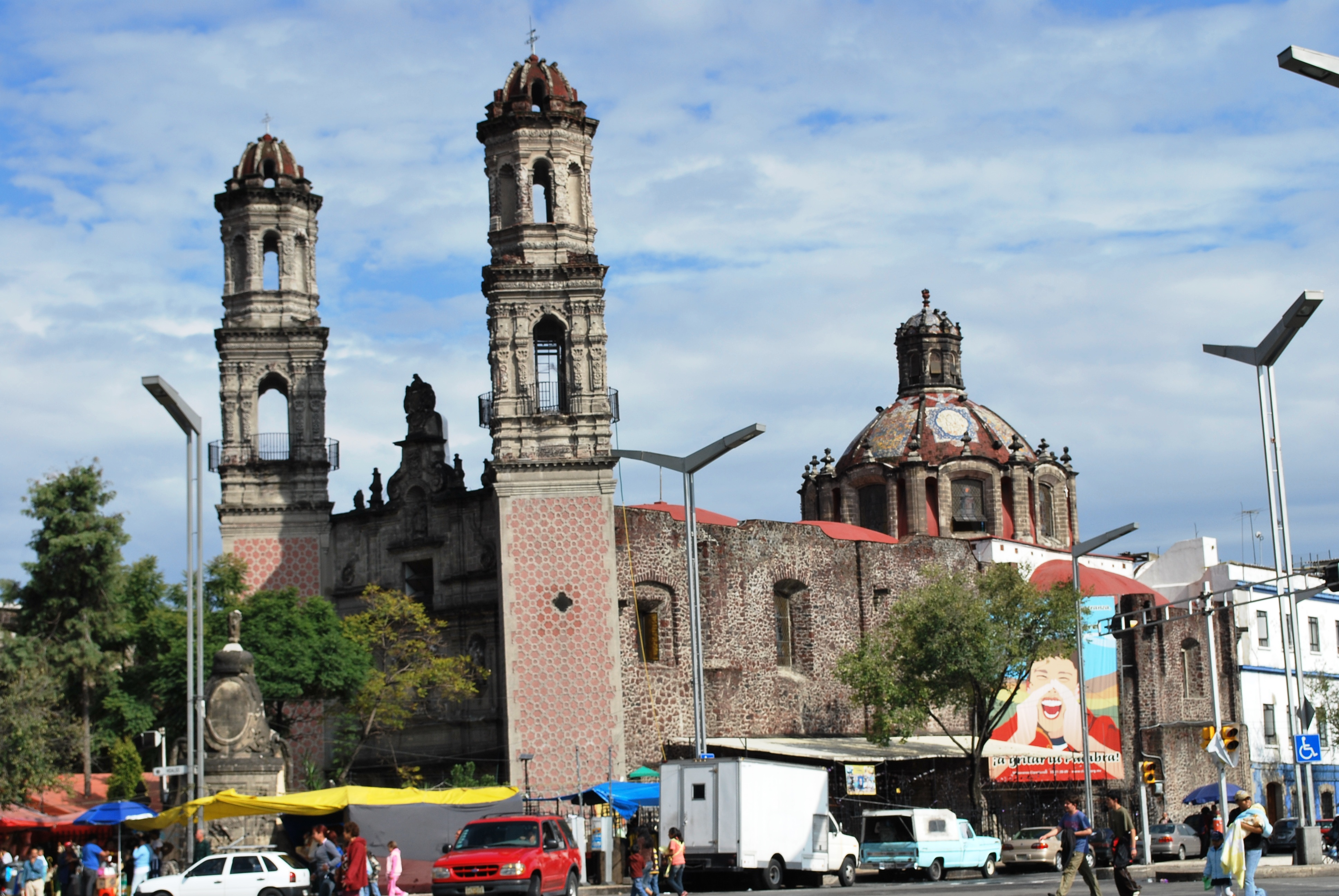
View of the San Hipolito Church

The San Hipólito Church on the corner of Hidalgo and Paseo de la Reforma, marks the location where the majority of Spanish people died during La Noche Triste in 1521, as the Spanish retreated towards Tacuba. After the Conquest, the Spanish located a hermitage here to commemorate their dead. The current church was begun in 1559 and eventually was expanded to include a hospital at the end of the 17th century.

The Inmaculado Corazón de María Church is squarely located in the colonia. It was begun in 1887 and designed by engineer Ismael Rego in Neo-Gothic style. It was finished in 1902. Originally, it was supposed to have three naves, but only one was constructed. For this reason, the building is out of proportion. Despite its stone columns and iron arches, it was severely damaged in the earthquake of 1957, which separated the south wall from the vault. This damage was never repaired, so when the earthquake of 1985 occurred, part of the building completely collapsed. Government authorities decided to demolish the rest of the church and rebuild it, keeping the old facade and towers which had not been damaged significantly.

== History ==
Its original names were Cuepopan, Colonia Bellavista, and Colonia San Fernando. It was created from horse facilities that belonged to the Propaganda FIDE de San Fernando College around 1873. Prior to this, this area was part of the old indigenous neighborhood of Cuepopan. The first church in this neighborhood was built in 1524, with a rotunda added in 1667. The area became named after this church: Santa María La Redonda, with “La Redonda” referring to the rotunda.

Another church from the early 19th century, Los Angeles, was founded in 1808 in what was called the Barrio de Los Angeles, which was separate from the city but is now part of the colonia. The modern neighborhood began to take shape in the beginning of the 19th century, and it grew after the demolition of part of the monastery of San Fernando allowed for the created of Paseo Guerrero (today Eje Guerrero) in 1860. In the last decades of the century, the horse facilities were owned by Rafael Martinez de la Torre, who created the Rancho de Santa María. Later, he subdivided it into housing units. The new colonia had a small plaza or park which was named after Martinez de la Torre. Today, it is the site of the Inmaculado Corazón de María Church (on the corner of Heroes and Mosqueta) and the Martinez de la Torre Market. Another small plaza was named after the last ranch owner's wife, Concepcion Cuevas, but that was changed in 1920.

While it is believed that most of the formation of the modern neighborhood occurred with the development project of 1873, there is house at 180 Guerrero Street with a stone inscription stating it was the first house built in the colonia in 1874, and reformed in 1891. Named streets around that time included Zarco, Humboldt, Guerrero, Zaragoza, Nonoalco (today Ricardo Flores Magón), Violeta, Magnolia, Moctezuma, Mosqueta and Degollado y Camelia. According to a set of plans from 1870, there are also more blocks laid out north of Camelia street but only one has a name: Cuca.

The cemetery belonging to Santa Maria La Redonda still existed at that time, which was primarily used to bury people of few means. However, a few notable people were also buried here including President Melchor Múzquiz and the last viceroy of New Spain, María de Josefa Sánchez Barriga y Blanco de O’Donojú. Antonio Lopez de Santa Anna also buried the leg he lost in Veracruz during the Pastry War, but it was removed from here sometime later. After the cemetery was closed, it was eventually redeveloped and became the site of the Hosteria de Santo Tómas de Villa nueva and today it is the Hotel Cortés, the Hospital de San Hipolito and the Temple of San Juan de Dios on Hidalgo Street.

The first urban train in Mexico City passed through this area, heading north to the Villa of Guadalupe and operated in the mid 19th century. At the beginning of the 20th century, electric trolleys were introduced, with two lines passing through here, one providing service from between San Juan and Lerdo and the other between the Zócalo and ending here. In the second half of the 20th century, Avenida Hidalgo and Santa Maria La Redonda Streets were widened, and Paseo de la Reforma was extended north. By 1979, three main arteries passed through here called Eje Guerrero, Eje Mosquesta and Eje Central Lazaro Cardenas. This transformed what used to be a quiet residential area.

From the 1930s to 1994 the Escuela Nacional de Pintura, Escultura y Grabado "La Esmeralda" (National School of Painting, Sculpture and Engraving) was located in the Callejón de la Esmeralda in the colonia, today named Calle San Fernando.

== Crime ==
The colonia is considered to be one of the most dangerous in the Cuauhtémoc borough, with a number of high-profile murders and gangland-style executions in 2010. Crime statistics here are more than 50% more than average, mostly consisting of robbery, family violence, home invasion and drug sales. The most dangerous streets are Estrella, Zarco, Degollado, Sol, Luna y Magnolia, Eje Central and Paseo de la Reforma, according to the Procuraduría General de Justicia del Distrito Federal.

== Transportation ==
=== Public transportation ===
The area is served by the Mexico City Metro and Metrobús.

Metro stations

- Guerrero
- Garibaldi/Lagunilla
- Hidalgo

Metrobús stations

- Ricardo Flores Magón
- Guerrero
- Mina
