= Copilco metro station =

Mexico City metro station

Copilco
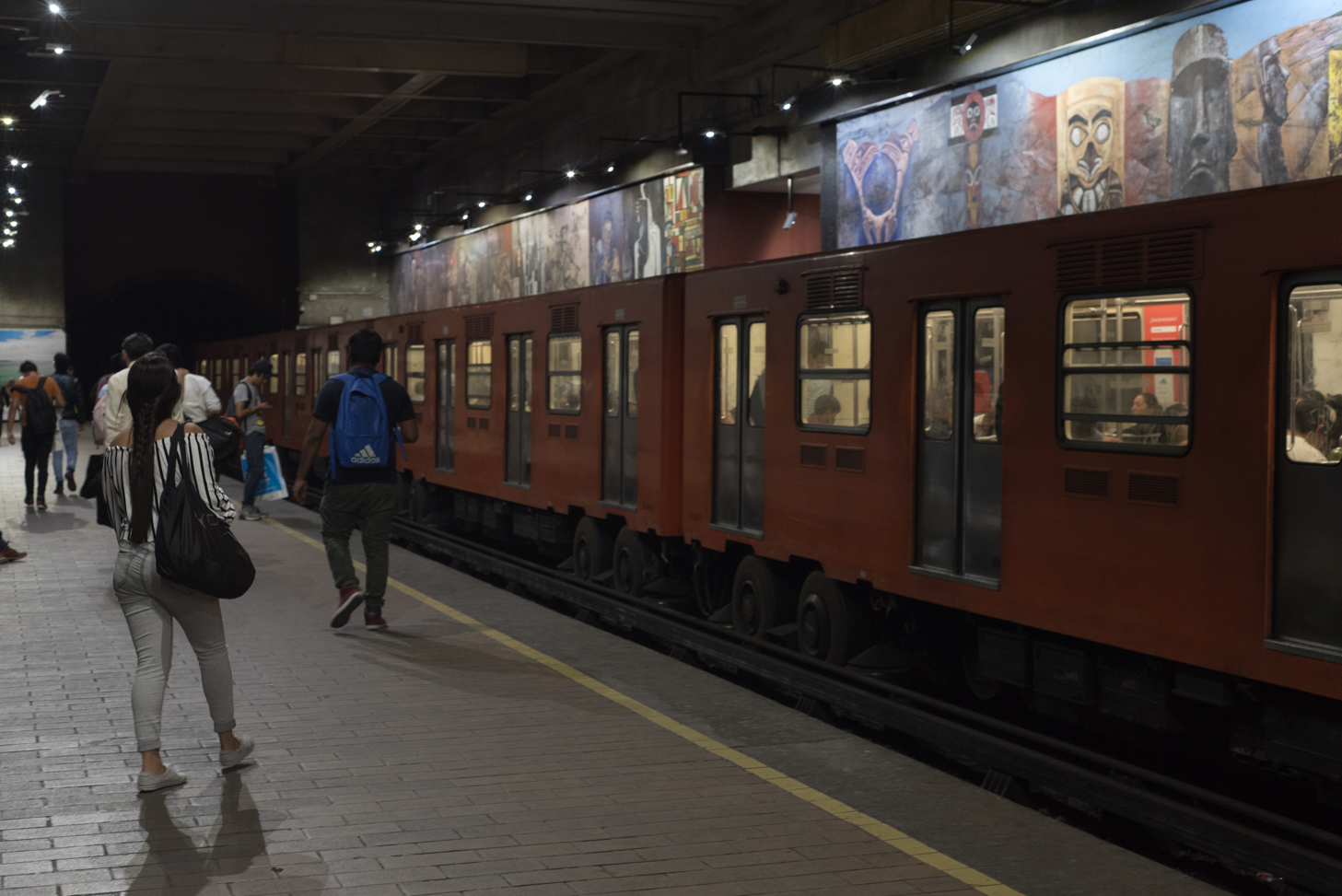

General information
- Location: Romero de Terreros, Coyoacán; Mexico City; Mexico
- Coordinates: 19°20′09″N 99°10′36″W
- System: Mexico City Metro
- Platforms: 2 side platforms
- Tracks: 2

Construction
- Structure type: Underground
- Platform levels: 1
- Parking: No
- Cycle facilities: No
- Accessible: Yes

History
- Opened: 30 August 1983; 42 years ago

Passengers
- 2025: 10,927,105 (Note: The data here is limited to the most recent ten years to avoid excessive listings; earlier figures can be found in this page's history or on the Mexico City Metro website. To calculate the average daily ridership, the annual total is divided by 365 days (366 in leap years), with decimals omitted from the result. Each station per line is ranked individually, as the system counts transfer stations separately. The percentage change is calculated automatically using the data from the current year and the previous year.) ▼4.32%
- Rank: 24/195

Services
Preceding station	Mexico City Metro	Following station
Miguel Ángel de Quevedo toward Indios Verdes	Line 3	Universidad Terminus
Route map
Location
- Location within Mexico City
- Area map

Copilco is a station along Line 3 on the Mexico City Metro. Located in the Coyoacán borough, in the south of Mexico City, on Avenida Enríquez Ureña (Eje 10 Sur). It is the penultimate station along the southern portion of Line 3.

== General information ==
The station logo depicts an Olmec representation of a coiled water snake or dragon (symbols of the lightbug, which is also a personification of the God of Water). Copilco means "in the Royal Crown" in Nahuatl. The station opened on 30 August 1983.

Above the station's platforms is the mural El perfil del tiempo by Guillermo Ceniceros, depicting paintings and art from ancient pre-Hispanic cultures, works by famous artists such as Leonardo da Vinci, and Mexican art from José Guadalupe Posada, Diego Rivera and others. This station also has a cultural display.

Many of the passengers are students, headed for the nearby campus of the National Autonomous University of Mexico (UNAM). Metro Copilco is particularly close to the schools of medicine and dentistry. This station serves the Copilco Universidad, Romero de Terreros, Copilco el Alto and Pedregal de Santo Domingo neighborhoods, as well as several estates (closed groups of high-density residential buildings), such as Integración Latinoamericana and Copilco 300.

== Nearby ==
- School of Odontology, UNAM
- School of Economics, UNAM
- School of Chemistry, UNAM
- School of Engineering, UNAM
- Central Library of the National Autonomous University of Mexico (UNAM)

== Exits ==
- Southeast: Cerro Tres Zapotes street and Eje 10 Sur Enríquez Ureña, Romero de Terreros
- Southwest: Cerro Tlapacoya street and Eje 10 Sur Enríquez Ureña, Romero de Terreros
- North: Eje 10 Sur Enríquez Ureña, Romero de Terreros

== Gallery ==
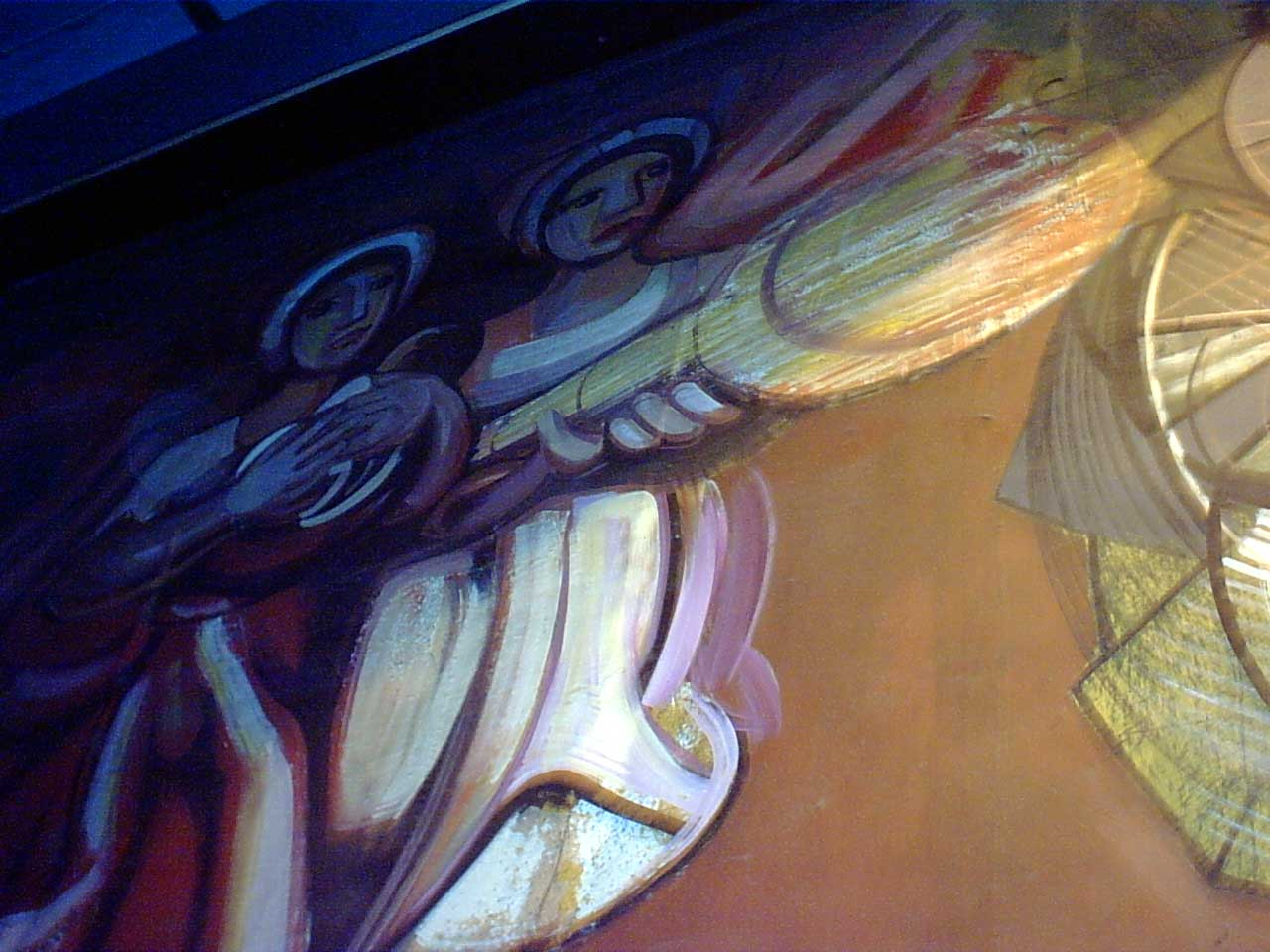
Mural above platform (Detail)

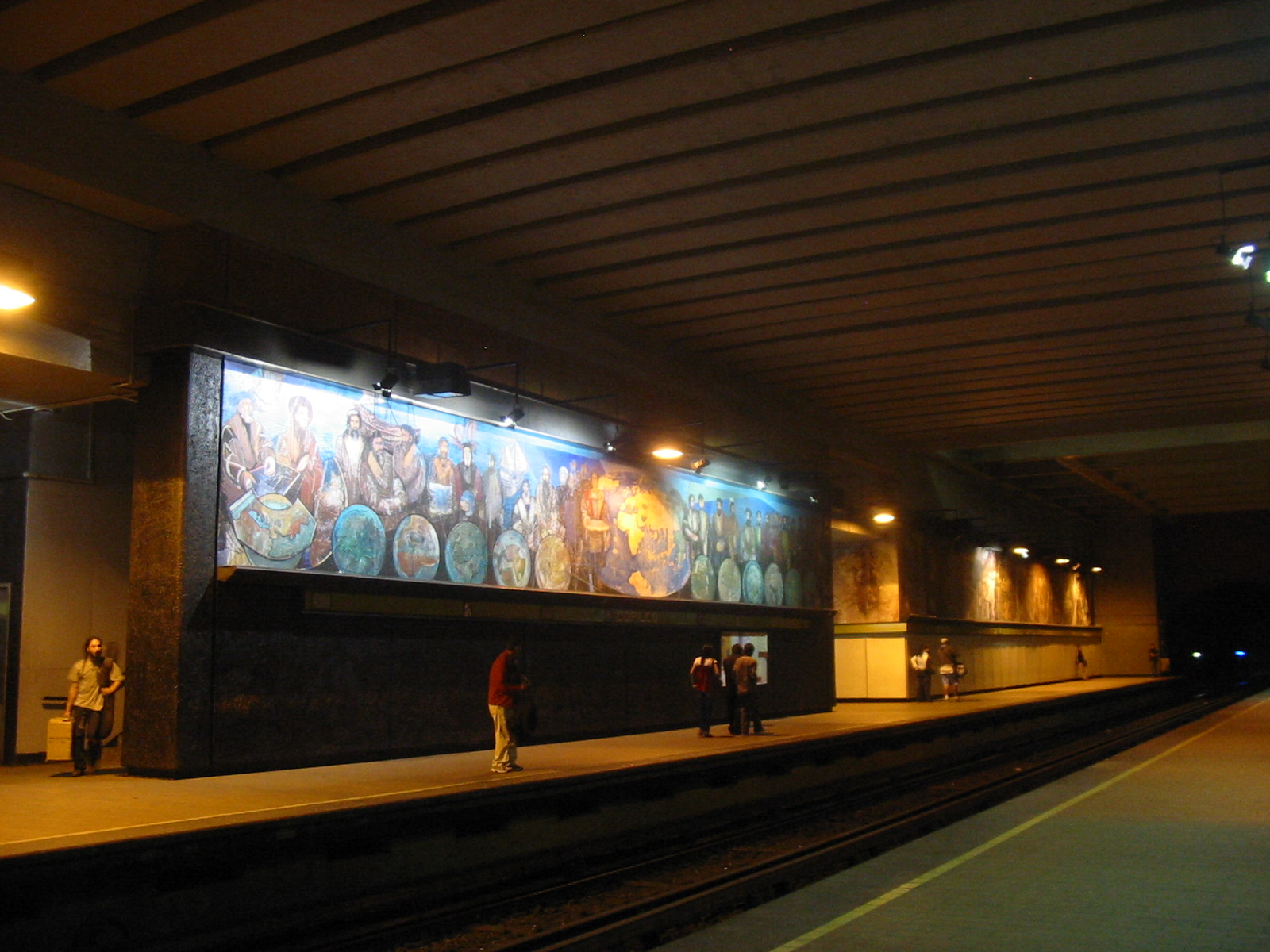
One of the murals inside Metro Copilco

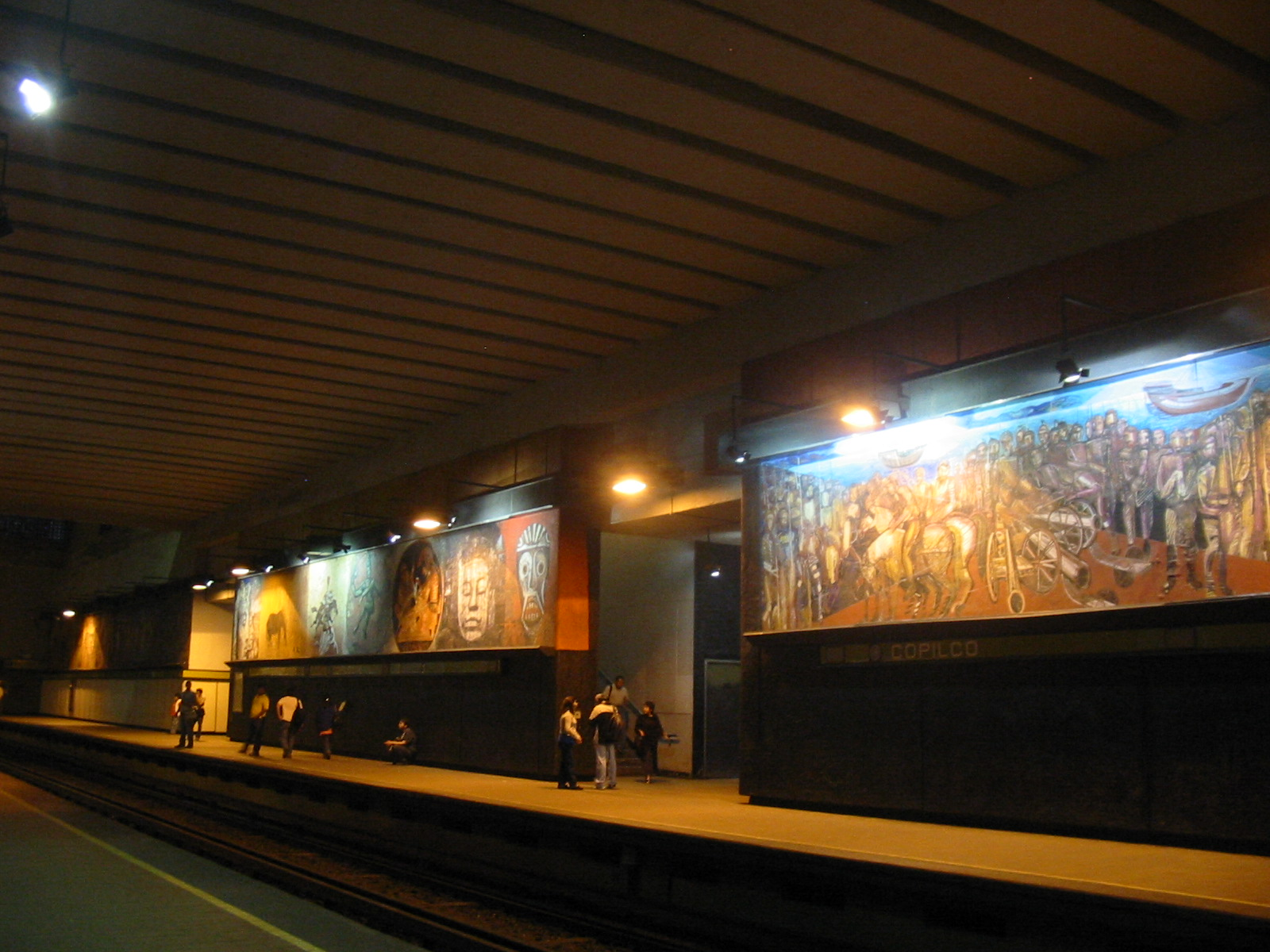
Two of the murals inside Metro Copilco

== Ridership ==
Annual passenger ridership
Year	Ridership	Average daily	Rank	% change	Ref.
2025	10,927,105	29,937	24/195	−4.32%
2024	11,420,379	31,203	17/195	+0.75%
2023	11,335,490	31,056	18/195	+21.53%
2022	9,327,411	25,554	22/195	+101.59%
2021	4,626,936	12,676	57/195	−26.59%
2020	6,302,582	17,220	39/195	−55.08%
2019	14,030,121	38,438	23/195	−4.20%
2018	14,645,189	40,123	23/195	−2.25%
2017	14,981,668	41,045	22/195	+0.16%
2016	14,958,149	40,869	20/195	+8.67%
