= Mexico City Metro Line 3 =

Metro line in Mexico City

Line 3

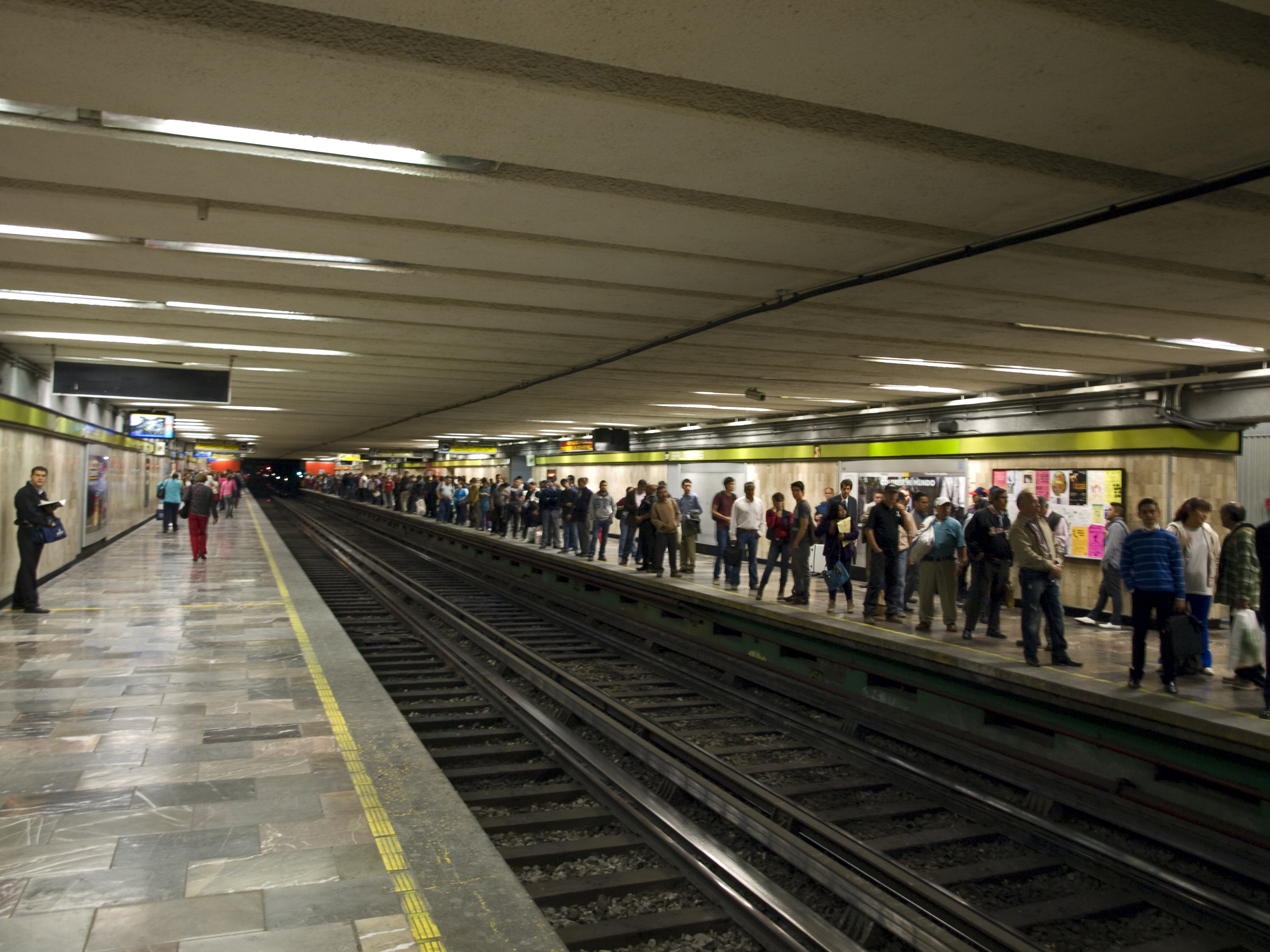
- Balderas station

Overview
- Locale: Mexico City
- Termini: Indios Verdes; Universidad
- Connecting lines: at Deportivo 18 de Marzo; at La Raza; at Guerrero; at Hidalgo; at Balderas; at Centro Médico; at Zapata
- Stations: 21
- Website: metro.cdmx.gob.mx

Service
- Type: Rapid transit
- System: Mexico City Metro
- Operator: Sistema de Transporte Colectivo (STC)
- Rolling stock: NM-79, NM-83A, NE-92
- Ridership: 172,315,795 (2024)

History
- Opened: 20 November 1970; 55 years ago
- Last extension: 1983

Technical
- Line length: 21.278 km (13.2 mi)
- Track length: 23.609 km (14.7 mi)
- Number of tracks: 2
- Track gauge: 1,435 mm (4 ft 8 1/2 in) standard gauge with roll ways along track
- Electrification: Guide bar, 750 V DC
- Operating speed: 36 km/h (22 mph)
Route map
Line 3 route highlighted in gray

Mexico City Metro Line 3 is one of the 12 metro lines built in Mexico City, Mexico.

Line 3 is the longest line, its color is olive green and it runs from north to south of the city covering almost all of it.

It is built under Avenida de los Insurgentes, Guerrero, Zarco, Balderas, Cuauhtémoc, Universidad, Copilco and Delfín Madrigal avenues. It interchanges with Line 6 at Deportivo 18 de Marzo, Line 5 at La Raza, Line B at Guerrero, Line 2 at Hidalgo, Line 1 at Balderas, Line 9 at Centro Médico. and Line 12 at Zapata.

== Chronology ==
- 20 November 1970: from Tlatelolco to Hospital General
- 25 August 1978: from Tlatelolco to La Raza
- 1 December 1979: from La Raza to Indios Verdes
- 7 June 1980: from Hospital General to Centro Médico
- 25 August 1980: from Centro Médico to Zapata
- 30 August 1983: from Zapata to Universidad

== Rolling stock ==
Line 3 has had different types of rolling stock throughout the years.

- Alstom MP-68: 1970–1981
- Concarril NM-73: 1978–1981
- Concarril NM-79 1982–present
- Alstom MP-82 1985–1994
- Concarril NM-83 1990–present
- Bombardier NC-82: 2004–2012
- CAF NE-92, 2023–present

The NM-79 trains were made in Mexico in 1979 by Concarril and the NM-83A trains were made in México by Concarril between 1983 and 1991.

Currently, out of the 390 trains in the Mexico City Metro network, 50 are in service in Line 3, more than in any other line.

== Station list ==
Key (Note: The following list was adapted from different websites and official maps.: Metro connections obtained from the official Mexico City Metro system map.; Accessibility obtained from the Mexico City Metro system map. In some cases, the map omits the accessibility icon as the station(s) are actually partially accessible. However, the respective websites of each station on the official site indicate the respective accessibility methods. Stations with the symbol ‡ are fully accessible; stations with the symbol † are partially accessible.; Cablebús obtained from their official website.; Centro de transferencia modal (CETRAM;) obtained from the official website of the Órgano Regulador de Transporte.; Ecobici obtained from their official website.; Metrobús obtained from the Mexico City Metrobús system map.; Mexibús obtained from the official Mexico City Metro system map.; Mexicable obtained from the official Mexico City Metro system map.; Public buses network (peseros) obtained from the official website of the Órgano Regulador de Transporte.; Red de Transporte de Pasajeros obtained from their official website.; Trolleybuses obtained from their official website.)
Handicapped/disabled access	Fully accessible station	Cablebús Line {{{3}}}	Cablebús connection	Red de Transporte de Pasajeros	RTP connection
Handicapped/disabled access	Partially accessible station	Mexibús	Mexibús connection	Tren Interurbano	Tren Interurbano connection
Transfer hub	CETRAM transfer station	Mexicable	Mexicable connection	Tren Suburbano	Tren Suburbano connection
Transfer hub	ETRAM transfer station	Mexico City Metro	Mexico City Metro connection	Trolleybus	Trolleybus connection
Ecobici	Ecobici bikeshare	Mexico City minubus	Pesero connection	Xochimilco Light Rail	Xochimilco Light Rail connection

The stations from north to south are:

Station	Handicapped/disabled access	Opened	Level	Distance (km)		Connections	Location
Station	Handicapped/disabled access	Opened	Level	Between stations	Total	Connections	Location
Indios Verdes	Handicapped/disabled access	December 1, 1979	Ground-level	—N/a	0.0	101, 101A, 101B, 101D, 102, 108	Gustavo A. Madero
Deportivo 18 de Marzo		December 1, 1979	Ground-level	1.3	1.3	15B	Gustavo A. Madero
Potrero	Handicapped/disabled access	December 1, 1979	Ground-level	1.1	2.4	25, 104; 15C	Gustavo A. Madero
La Raza	Handicapped/disabled access	August 25, 1978	Underground, trench	1.2	3.6	23, 27A, 103; 20C, 20D	Gustavo A. Madero
Tlatelolco		November 20, 1970	Underground, trench	1.6	5.2	10D, 10E	Cuauhtémoc
Guerrero	Handicapped/disabled access	November 20, 1970	Underground, trench	1.1	6.3	10E, 11C	Cuauhtémoc
Hidalgo	Handicapped/disabled access	November 20, 1970	Underground, trench	0.9	7.2	27A; 16A	Cuauhtémoc
Juárez	Handicapped/disabled access	November 20, 1970	Underground, trench	0.4	7.6	Mexico City Metrobús Mexico City Metrobús Line 3 Mexico City Metrobús Line 4 Ecobici	Cuauhtémoc
Balderas	Handicapped/disabled access	November 20, 1970	Underground, trench	0.7	8.4	34A, SE L1; 19E, 19F, 19G, 19H	Cuauhtémoc
Niños Héroes/Poder Judicial CDMX	Handicapped/disabled access	November 20, 1970	Underground, trench	0.8	9.2		Cuauhtémoc
Hospital General	Handicapped/disabled access	November 20, 1970	Underground, trench	0.8	9.9	19F	Cuauhtémoc
Centro Médico	Handicapped/disabled access	June 7, 1980	Underground, trench	0.8	10.7	9C, 9E	Cuauhtémoc
Etiopía/Plaza de la Transparencia	Handicapped/disabled access	August 25, 1980	Underground, trench	1.5	12.3	Mexico City Metrobús Mexico City Metrobús Line 2 Mexico City Metrobús Line 3 Ecobici	Benito Juárez
Eugenia		August 25, 1980	Underground, trench	1.0	13.3	Mexico City Metrobús Mexico City Metrobús Line 3 Ecobici	Benito Juárez
División del Norte		August 25, 1980	Underground, trench	0.8	14.1	Mexico City Metrobús Mexico City Metrobús Line 3 Ecobici	Benito Juárez
Zapata	Handicapped/disabled access	August 25, 1980	Underground, trench	1.0	15.1	(at Pueblo Santa Cruz Atoyac); 1D, 52C, 120, 121A; 6A	Benito Juárez
Coyoacán		August 30, 1983	Underground, trench	1.2	16.4	200	Benito Juárez
Viveros/Derechos Humanos	Handicapped/disabled access	August 30, 1983	Underground	1.0	17.4	116A	Coyoacán
Miguel Ángel de Quevedo	Handicapped/disabled access	August 30, 1983	Underground	1.0	18.4	34B	Coyoacán
Copilco	Handicapped/disabled access	August 30, 1983	Underground, trench	1.4	19.8	123A, 125, 128	Coyoacán
Universidad	Handicapped/disabled access	August 30, 1983	Ground-level	1.5	21.3	17E, 123A, 125, 128, 134C, 134D, 162D; 2E; Pumabús (services Ciudad Universitaria)	Coyoacán

== Ridership ==
The following table shows each of Line 3 stations total and average daily ridership during 2019.

†	Transfer station
‡	Terminal

Rank	Station	Total ridership	Average daily
1	Indios Verdes‡	39,192,273	107,376
2	Universidad‡	26,555,624	72,755
3	Copilco	14,030,121	38,439
4	Deportivo 18 de Marzo†	12,397,054	33,965
5	Miguel Ángel de Quevedo	12,101,570	33,155
6	La Raza†	11,364,171	31,135
7	Etiopía / Plaza de la Transparencia	10,885,701	29,824
8	Coyoacán	9,780,261	26,795
9	Zapata†	9,027,192	24,732
10	Niños Héroes / Poder Judicial CDMX	7,865,930	21,550
11	Viveros / Derechos Humanos	7,727,513	21,171
12	Tlatelolco	7,562,593	20,719
13	Hospital General	7,478,953	20,490
14	Centro Médico†	7,395,505	20,262
15	Eugenia	6,700,579	18,358
16	División del Norte	6,552,063	17,951
17	Hidalgo†	6,378,926	17,477
18	Juárez	6,320,737	17,317
19	Potrero	6,317,545	17,308
20	Guerrero†	3,893,901	10,668
21	Balderas†	2,840,045	7,781
Total		222,368,257	609,228

== Tourism ==
Line 3 passes near several places of interest:

- Plaza de las Tres Culturas, square in the Tlatelolco neighborhood.
- Historic center of Mexico City
- Ciudad Universitaria, the main campus of the National Autonomous University of Mexico

== See also ==
- List of Mexico City Metro lines
- 2023 Mexico City Metro train crash
