= Hospital General metro station (Mexico City) =

Mexico City metro station

Hospital General
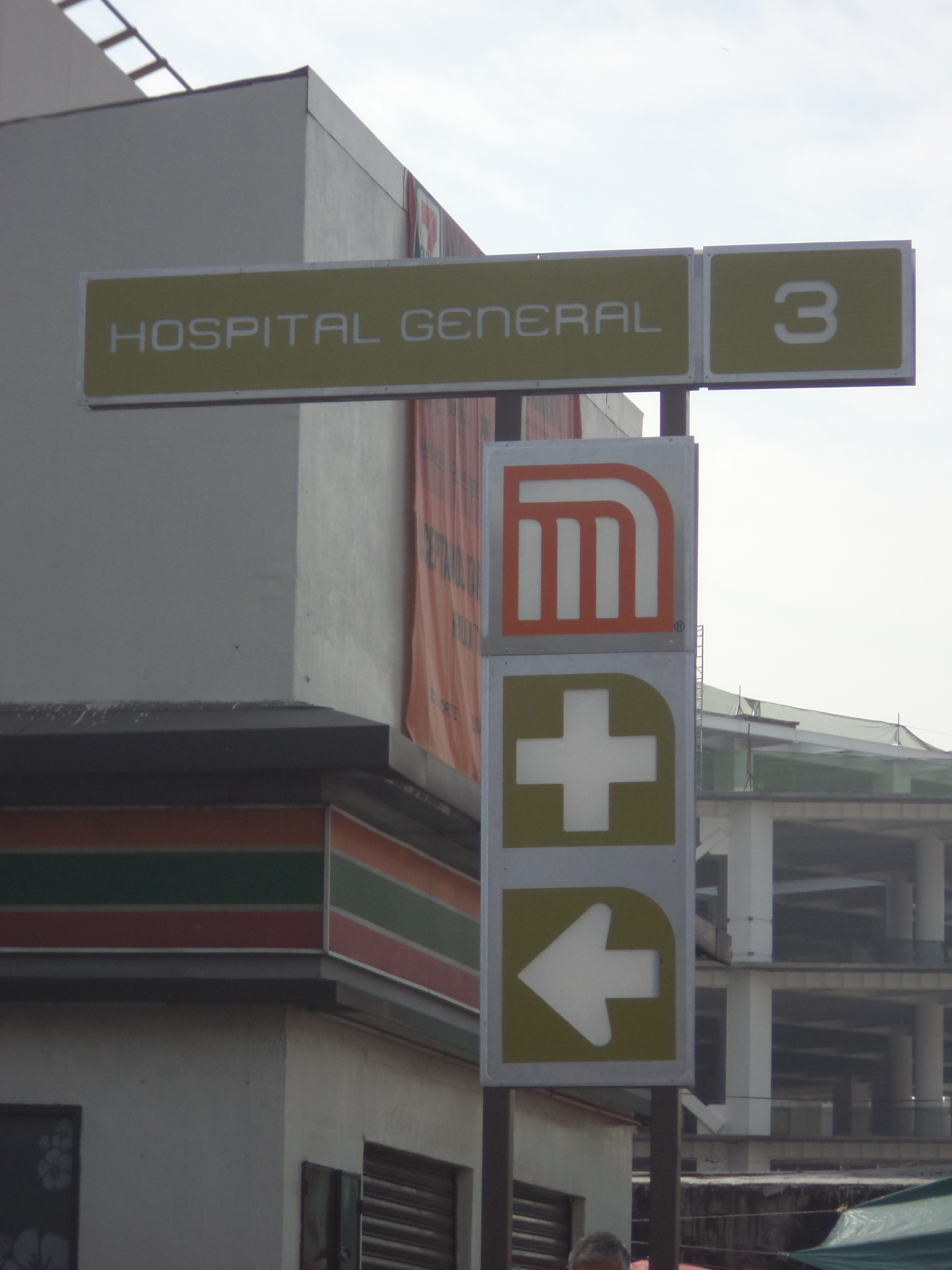

General information
- Location: Mexico City; Mexico
- Coordinates: 19°24′49″N 99°09′14″W
- System: Mexico City Metro
- Platforms: 2 side platforms
- Tracks: 2
- Connections: Hospital General

Construction
- Structure type: Underground
- Depth: 15 m (49 ft)
- Accessible: Partial

History
- Opened: 20 November 1970; 55 years ago

Passengers
- 2025: 5,797,040 (Note: The data here is limited to the most recent ten years to avoid excessive listings; earlier figures can be found in this page's history or on the Mexico City Metro website. To calculate the average daily ridership, the annual total is divided by 365 days (366 in leap years), with decimals omitted from the result. Each station per line is ranked individually, as the system counts transfer stations separately. The percentage change is calculated automatically using the data from the current year and the previous year.) ▼1.55%
- Rank: 83/195

Services
Preceding station	Mexico City Metro	Following station
Niños Héroes toward Indios Verdes	Line 3	Centro Médico toward Universidad
Route map
Location
- Location within Mexico City
- Area map

Hospital General is a metro station along Line 3 of the Mexico City Metro. It is located in the Cuauhtémoc borough of Mexico City.

== General information ==
This station transfers to the "S" trolleybus line, which runs between ISSSTE Zaragoza and Chapultepec.

Hospital General serves passengers in the Colonias (neighborhoods) of Doctores and Roma. The station opened on 20 November 1970 when it served as the southern terminus of Line 3. Service southward towards Centro Médico started 10 years later on 7 June 1980.

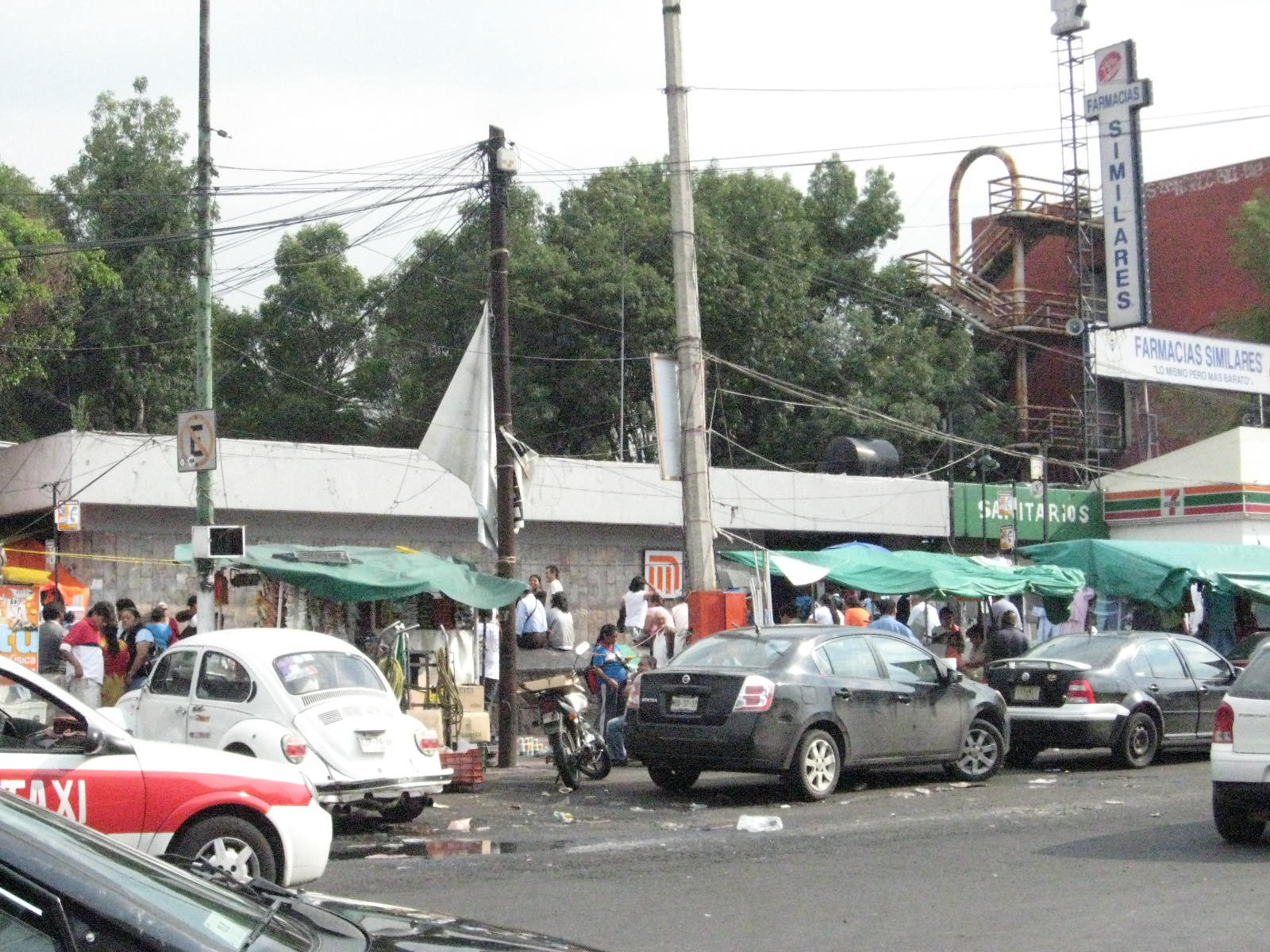
Entrance to Metro Hospital General, almost completely obscured by sidewalk vendors

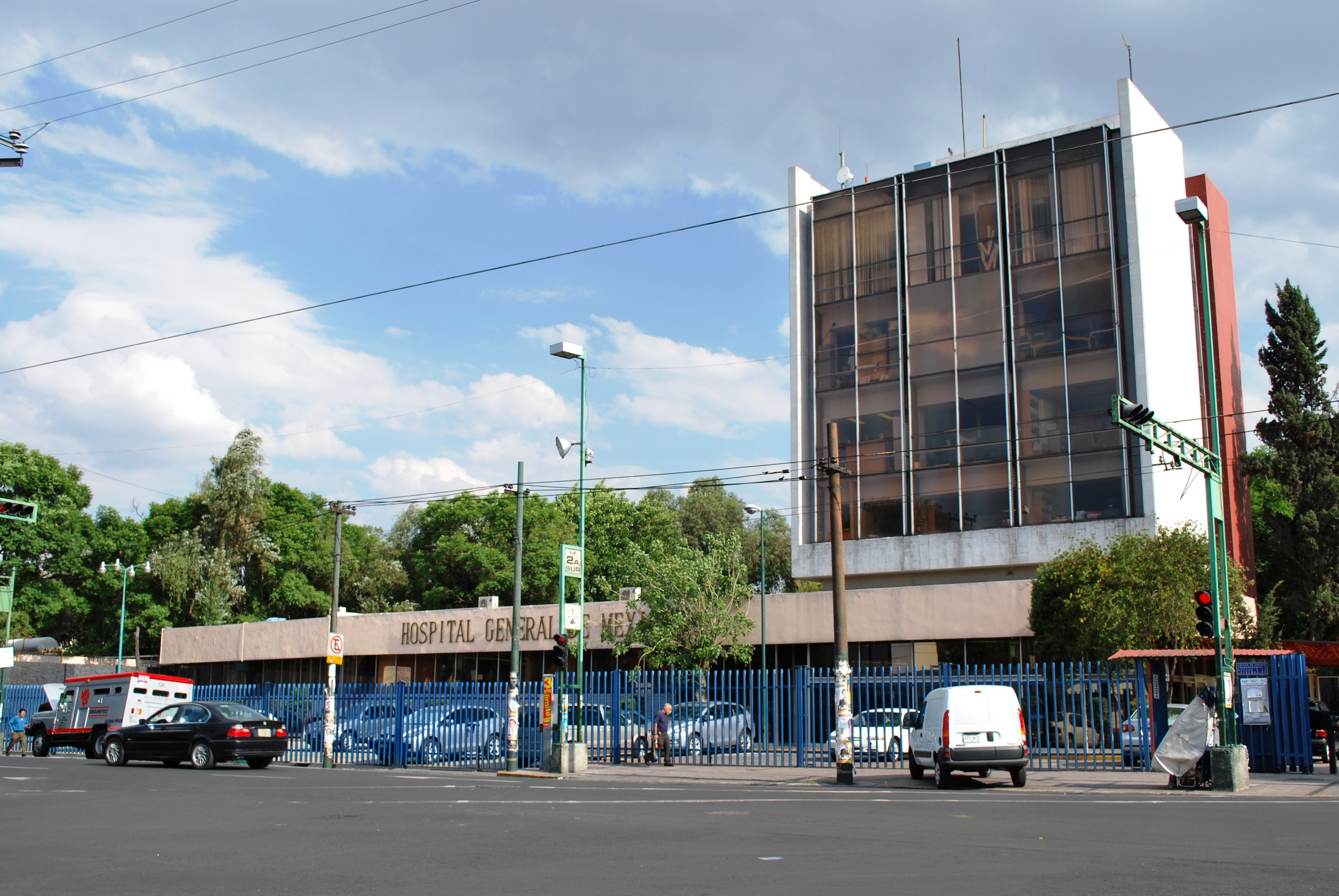
Hospital General de Mexico for which the station is named

=== Name and iconography ===
The station logo represents the symbol of International Red Cross. Its name refers to the General Hospital of Mexico, which is located above the station.

=== Ridership ===
Annual passenger ridership
Year	Ridership	Average daily	Rank	% change	Ref.
2025	5,797,040	15,882	83/195	−1.55%
2024	5,888,424	16,088	78/195	+4.36%
2023	5,642,524	15,458	80/195	+11.18%
2022	5,075,058	13,904	87/195	+48.31%
2021	3,421,978	9,375	91/195	−16.17%
2020	4,082,080	11,153	89/195	−45.42%
2019	7,478,953	20,490	87/195	−5.12%
2018	7,882,229	21,595	81/195	−1.90%
2017	8,035,005	22,013	73/195	−4.91%
2016	8,449,620	23,086	73/195	−1.36%
