= Universidad metro station (Mexico City) =

Mexico City metro station

Universidad
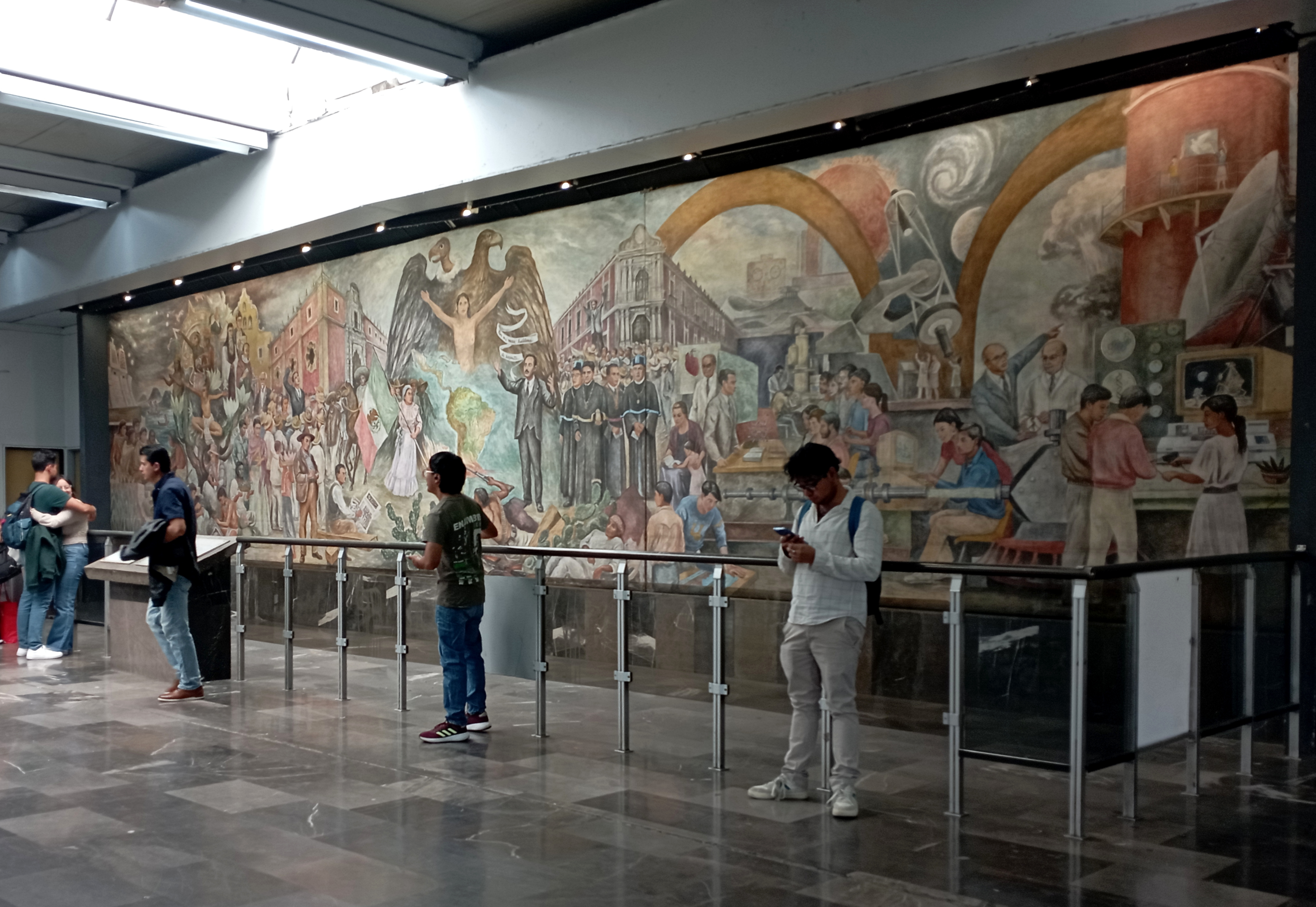
- One of the murals painted on the Metro Universidad Station. It was painted by Arturo García Bustos and titled La Universidad en el umbral del siglo XXI and dated 1989.

General information
- Other names: C.U.
- Location: Av. Antonio Delfín Madrigal; Pedregal de Santo Domingo, Coyoacán; Mexico City; Mexico
- Coordinates: 19°19′28″N 99°10′26″W
- System: Mexico City Metro
- Platforms: 2 side platforms
- Tracks: 3
- Connections: Universidad; Routes: 17-E, 123-A, 125, 128, 134-C, 134-D, 162-D; Line 14

Construction
- Structure type: At grade
- Platform levels: 1
- Parking: No
- Cycle facilities: Yes
- Accessible: Partial

History
- Opened: 30 August 1983; 42 years ago

Passengers
- 2025: 18,716,988 (Note: The data here is limited to the most recent ten years to avoid excessive listings; earlier figures can be found in this page's history or on the Mexico City Metro website. To calculate the average daily ridership, the annual total is divided by 365 days (366 in leap years), with decimals omitted from the result. Each station per line is ranked individually, as the system counts transfer stations separately. The percentage change is calculated automatically using the data from the current year and the previous year.) ▲2.46%
- Rank: 7/195

Services
| Preceding station | Mexico City Metro | Following station |
|---|---|---|
| Copilco toward Indios Verdes | Line 3 | Terminus |
Route map
Location
- Location within Mexico City
- Area map

Universidad (also frequently called Metro C.U., from Ciudad Universitaria) is a station on the Mexico City Metro. It is located in the southern reaches of Mexico City, in Coyoacán borough. A surface station, it is the current terminus of Line 3. The station was opened on 30 August 1983. In 2021, the station had an average ridership of 25,858 passengers per day, making it the fifteenth busiest station in the network.

== General information ==
The station logo is a crest bearing a bird with the head of a condor and of an eagle, and the legend "Por mi Raza hablará el Espíritu"; this is the official coat of arms of the Universidad Nacional Autónoma de México (UNAM), which the station serves.

This metro terminal is multimodal, connecting with microbus lines that serve zones like Tlalpan, Ajusco, Milpa Alta and Contreras. It also connects with the UNAM's internal bus base, with buses that give free service on the campus, between schools, institutes and sports facilities, including the México 68 Olympic Stadium. It also serves the Pedregal de Santo Domingo and Copilco el Alto neighbourhoods.

Metro Universidad also has facilities for the handicapped, and a large mural depicting the history of UNAM.

== Nearby ==
- Ciudad Universitaria, main campus of the National Autonomous University of Mexico.
- Museo Universitario Arte Contemporáneo, contemporary art museum.

== Exits ==
- East: Antonio Delfín Madrigal avenue, Pedregal de Santo Domingo
- West: Antonio Delfín Madrigal avenue, Pedregal de Santo Domingo

== Ridership ==
Annual passenger ridership
| Year | Ridership | Average daily | Rank | % change | Ref. |
|---|---|---|---|---|---|
| 2025 | 18,716,988 | 51,279 | 7/195 | +2.46% |
| 2024 | 18,267,530 | 49,911 | 6/195 | +2.91% |
| 2023 | 17,750,776 | 48,632 | 6/195 | +8.25% |
| 2022 | 16,398,629 | 44,927 | 8/195 | +73.75% |
| 2021 | 9,438,252 | 25,858 | 15/195 | −22.30% |
| 2020 | 12,146,531 | 33,187 | 12/195 | −54.26% |
| 2019 | 26,555,624 | 72,755 | 8/195 | −2.37% |
| 2018 | 27,199,538 | 74,519 | 8/195 | +1.77% |
| 2017 | 26,726,286 | 73,222 | 9/195 | −1.10% |
| 2016 | 27,022,576 | 73,832 | 9/195 | +2.49% |
