= Mexico City Metrobús Line 3 =

Bus route in Mexico City

Metrobús Line 3
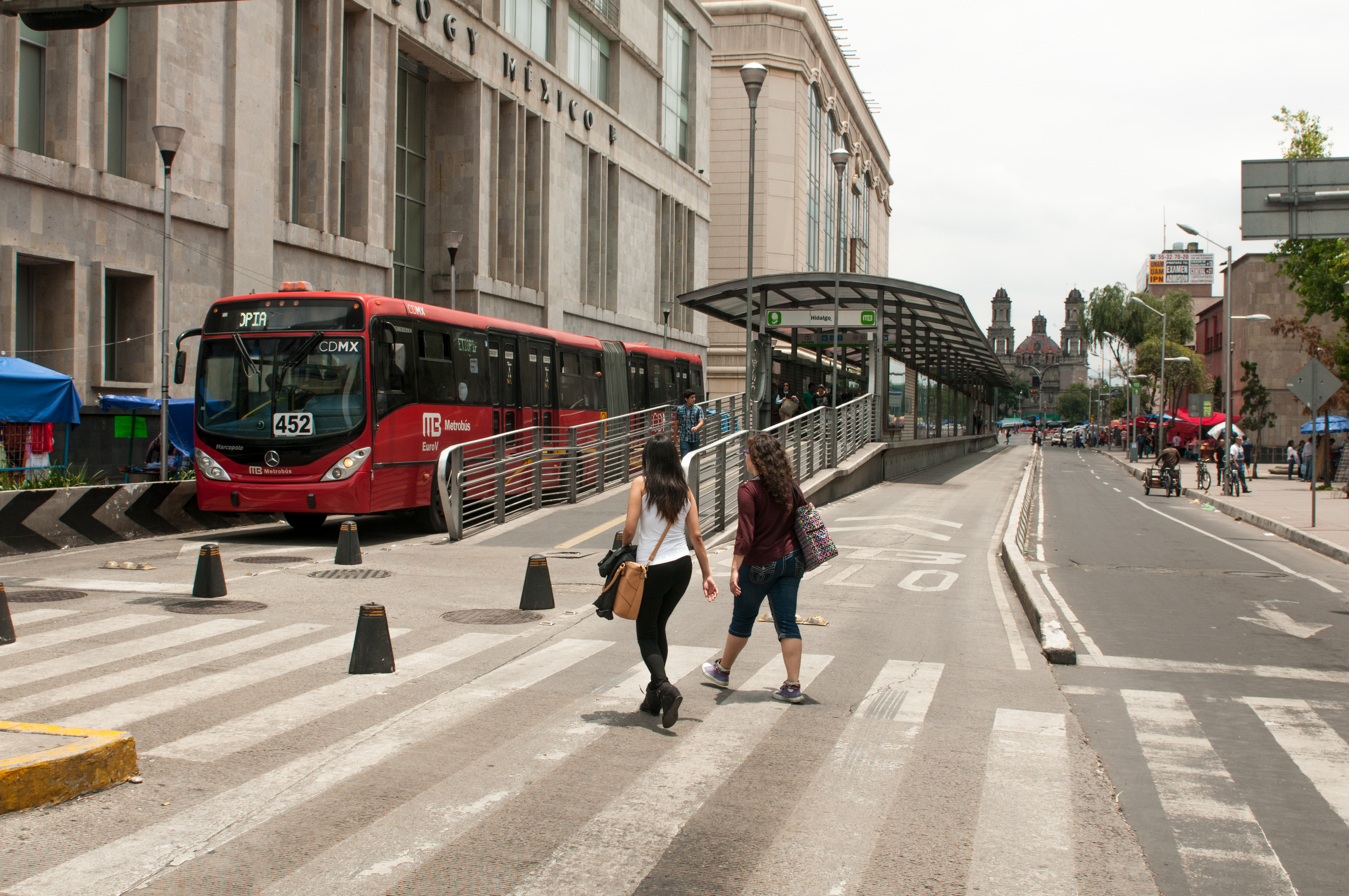
- A Metrobús in Hidalgo station

Overview
- Status: In service
- Termini: Tenayuca/Indios Verdes; Pueblo Santa Cruz Atoyac
- Stations: 39
- Website: Línea 3

Service
- Type: Bus rapid transit
- System: Mexico City Metrobus
- Services: 5
- Operator(s): See Operators

History
- Opened: February 8, 2011; 15 years ago

Technical
- Line length: 20 km (12.4 mi)
- Character: Exclusive right-of-way

The Mexico City Metrobús Line 3 is a bus rapid transit line in the Mexico City Metrobús. It operates between Tenayuca, in the limits with the State of Mexico in Gustavo A. Madero and Pueblo Santa Cruz Atoyac in the Benito Juárez boroughs, in southern Mexico City.

Line 3 has a total of 39 stations and a length of 20 kilometers and it runs from north to south.

Construction of Line 3 started on March 5, 2010, and it was inaugurated on February 8, 2011, by Marcelo Ebrard, Head of Government of the Federal District from 2006 to 2012.

In 2019, the Government of Mexico City announced 7 new stations to the south, ending near Hospital Xoco. Construction was expected to end by June 2020.

On March 10, 2021, had opening 5 new stations.

== Service description ==
=== Services ===
The line has five itineraries.

Tenayuca to Pueblo Santa Cruz Atoyac

To Pueblo Santa Cruz Atoyac
- First Bus: 4:30 (Monday-Friday)
- Last Bus: 23:24 (Monday-Friday)
- First Bus: 4:30 (Saturday)
- Last Bus: 23:27 (Saturday)
- First Bus: 5:00 (Sunday)
- Last Bus: 23:20 (Sunday)

To Tenayuca
- First Bus: 4:28 (Monday-Friday)
- Last Bus: 00:21 (Monday-Friday)
- First Bus: 4:30 (Saturday)
- Last Bus: 00:21 (Saturday)
- First Bus: 5:05 (Sunday)
- Last Bus: 00:14 (Sunday)

Tenayuca to Balderas

From Tenayuca
- First Bus: 6:00 (Monday-Friday)
- Last Bus: 21:49 (Monday-Friday)
- First Bus: 6:00 (Saturday)
- Last Bus: 21:33 (Saturday)
- First Bus: 7:00 (Sunday)
- Last Bus: 21:20 (Sunday)

To Tenayuca
- First Bus: 6:00 (Monday-Friday)
- Last Bus: 22:36 (Monday-Friday)
- First Bus: 6:37 (Saturday)
- Last Bus: 22:17 (Saturday)
- First Bus: 7:37 (Sunday)
- Last Bus: 22:05 (Sunday)

Tenayuca to Buenavista

From Tenayuca
- First Bus: 5:00 (Monday-Friday)
- Last Bus: 23:40 (Monday-Friday)
- First Bus: 5:00 (Saturday)
- Last Bus: 23:40 (Saturday)
- First Bus: 6:00 (Sunday)
- Last Bus: 23:35 (Sunday)

To Tenayuca
- First Bus: 4:58 (Monday-Friday)
- Last Bus: 00:19 (Monday-Friday)
- First Bus: 5:00 (Saturday)
- Last Bus: 00:16 (Saturday)
- First Bus: 6:00 (Sunday)
- Last Bus: 00:11 (Sunday)

Tenayuca to La Raza

From Tenayuca
- First Bus: 4:45 (Monday-Friday)
- Last Bus: 23:12 (Monday-Friday)
- First Bus: 4:45 (Saturday)
- Last Bus: 23:17 (Saturday)
- First Bus: 5:30 (Sunday)
- Last Bus: 23:07 (Sunday)

To Tenayuca
- First Bus: 4:45 (Monday-Friday)
- Last Bus: 23:40 (Monday-Friday)
- First Bus: 4:44 (Saturday)
- Last Bus: 23:43 (Saturday)
- First Bus: 5:29 (Sunday)
- Last Bus: 23:34 (Sunday)

Pueblo Santa Cruz Atoyac to Indios Verdes

From Pueblo Santa Cruz Atoyac
- First Bus: 4:34 (Monday-Friday)
- Last Bus: 23:46 (Monday-Friday)
- First Bus: 6:04 (Saturday)
- Last Bus: 00:33 (Saturday)
- First Bus: 6:04 (Sunday)
- Last Bus: 00:33 (Sunday)

To Indios Verdes
- First Bus: 4:30 (Monday-Friday)
- Last Bus: 22:42 (Monday-Friday)
- First Bus: 5:00 (Saturday)
- Last Bus: 23:29 (Saturday)
- First Bus: 5:00 (Sunday)
- Last Bus: 23:29 (Sunday)

Line 3 services the Gustavo A. Madero, Azcapotzalco, Cuauhtémoc and Benito Juárez boroughs.

=== Station list ===
Key (Note: The following list was adapted from different websites and official maps.: Metro connections obtained from the official Mexico City Metro system map.; Accessibility obtained from the Mexico City Metro system map. In some cases, the map omits the accessibility icon as the station(s) are actually partially accessible. However, the respective websites of each station on the official site indicate the respective accessibility methods. Stations with the symbol ‡ are fully accessible; stations with the symbol † are partially accessible.; Cablebús obtained from their official website.; Centro de transferencia modal (CETRAM;) obtained from the official website of the Órgano Regulador de Transporte.; Ecobici obtained from their official website.; Metrobús obtained from the Mexico City Metrobús system map.; Mexibús obtained from the official Mexico City Metro system map.; Mexicable obtained from the official Mexico City Metro system map.; Public buses network (peseros) obtained from the official website of the Órgano Regulador de Transporte.; Red de Transporte de Pasajeros obtained from their official website.; Trolleybuses obtained from their official website.)
Handicapped/disabled access	Fully accessible station	Cablebús Line {{{3}}}	Cablebús connection	Red de Transporte de Pasajeros	RTP connection
Handicapped/disabled access	Partially accessible station	Mexibús	Mexibús connection	Tren Interurbano	Tren Interurbano connection
Transfer hub	CETRAM transfer station	Mexicable	Mexicable connection	Tren Suburbano	Tren Suburbano connection
Transfer hub	ETRAM transfer station	Mexico City Metro	Mexico City Metro connection	Trolleybus	Trolleybus connection
Ecobici	Ecobici bikeshare	Mexico City minubus	Pesero connection	Xochimilco Light Rail	Xochimilco Light Rail connection

==== Tenayuca–Pueblo Santa Cruz Atoyac route ====
Stations (Note: All the stations are fully accessible to people with disabilities.)	Connections	Neighborhood(s)	Borough	Picture	Date opened
Tenayuca		Santa Rosa; San José de la Escalera	Gustavo A. Madero		February 8, 2011
San José de la Escalera		Santa Rosa; San José de la Escalera	Gustavo A. Madero		February 8, 2011
Progreso Nacional		Progreso Nacional	Gustavo A. Madero		February 8, 2011
Tres Anegas		Amp. Progreso Nacional	Gustavo A. Madero		February 8, 2011
Júpiter		Nueva Industrial Vallejo	Gustavo A. Madero		February 8, 2011
La Patera	107B	Industrial Vallejo; Nueva Industrial Vallejo	Azcapotzalco; Gustavo A. Madero		February 8, 2011
Poniente 146		Industrial Vallejo; Nueva Vallejo	Azcapotzalco; Gustavo A. Madero		February 8, 2011
Montevideo	Mexico City Metrobús Mexico City Metrobús Line 6	Industrial Vallejo; Nueva Vallejo	Azcapotzalco; Gustavo A. Madero		February 8, 2011
Poniente 134		Lindavista Vallejo III Sección	Azcapotzalco; Gustavo A. Madero		February 8, 2011
Poniente 128	(at Vallejo)	Santa Cruz de las Salinas; Nueva Vallejo	Azcapotzalco; Gustavo A. Madero		February 8, 2011
Magdalena de las Salinas		Coltongo; Magdalena de las Salinas	Azcapotzalco; Gustavo A. Madero		February 8, 2011
Coltongo	15A	Coltongo; Magdalena de las Salinas	Azcapotzalco; Gustavo A. Madero		February 8, 2011
Cuitláhuac	(at Calzada Vallejo); 11A, 12	Pro Hogar; Guadalupe Victoria	Azcapotzalco; Gustavo A. Madero		February 8, 2011
Héroe de Nacozari	20C	Porvernir; Héroe de Nacozari	Azcapotzalco; Gustavo A. Madero		February 8, 2011
Hospital La Raza	20C	San Francisco Xocotitla; Vallejo Poniente	Azcapotzalco; Gustavo A. Madero		February 8, 2011
La Raza (Note: Accessible from Tenayuca–La Raza route)	11A (at distance), 12 (at distance), 23, 27A, 103; 7D (at distance), 20C, 20D	Vallejo Poniente	Gustavo A. Madero		February 8, 2011
Circuito	200; 7D (at distance), 20A, 20D	Santa María Insurgentes	Cuauhtémoc		February 8, 2011
Tolnáhuac		San Simón Tolnáhuac	Cuauhtémoc		February 8, 2011
Tlatelolco	Line 3; 10B	Nonoalco Tlatelolco	Cuauhtémoc		February 8, 2011
Ricardo Flores Magón	18	Buenavista; Guerrero	Cuauhtémoc		February 8, 2011
Guerrero	10E, 11C	Buenavista; Guerrero	Cuauhtémoc		February 8, 2011
Buenavista (Note: Accessible from Tenayuca–Buenavista route)	(at Buenavista); 10E, 11C, 12B; (at distance)	Buenavista; Guerrero	Cuauhtémoc		February 8, 2011
Mina		Buenavista; Guerrero	Cuauhtémoc		February 8, 2011
Hidalgo	(at Metro Hidalgo); 27A; 16A; (at distance)	Centro	Cuauhtémoc		February 8, 2011
Juárez	Mexico City Metro Line 3 Mexico City Metrobús Mexico City Metrobús Line 4 Ecobici	Centro	Cuauhtémoc		February 8, 2011
Balderas	34A; 19E, 19F, 19G, 19H	Centro	Cuauhtémoc		February 8, 2011
Cuauhtémoc	34A; 19E, 19F, 19G, 19H	Roma Norte; Doctores	Cuauhtémoc		February 8, 2011
Jardín Pushkin	Ecobici	Roma Norte; Doctores	Cuauhtémoc		February 8, 2011
Hospital General	9A, 9C, 9E (at distance), 19F	Roma Norte; Doctores	Cuauhtémoc		February 8, 2011
Dr. Márquez	Ecobici	Roma Sur; Doctores	Cuauhtémoc		February 8, 2011
Centro Médico	9A, 9C, 9E	Roma Sur; Doctores	Cuauhtémoc		February 8, 2011
Obrero Mundial	Ecobici	Piedad Narvarte	Benito Juárez		February 8, 2011
Etiopía/Plaza de la Transparencia	Mexico City Metro Line 3 Mexico City Metrobús Mexico City Metrobús Line 2 Ecobici	Narvarte Poniente	Benito Juárez		February 8, 2011
Luz Saviñón	(at distance)	Narvarte Poniente; Narvarte Oriente	Benito Juárez		March 10, 2021
Eugenia	Mexico City Metro Line 3 Ecobici	Narvarte Poniente	Benito Juárez		March 10, 2021
División del Norte	Mexico City Metro Line 3 Ecobici	Narvarte Poniente	Benito Juárez		March 10, 2021
Miguel Laurent		Letrán Valle	Benito Juárez		March 10, 2021
Pueblo Santa Cruz Atoyac	Zapata (at distance); (at Zapata); (at Parque de los Venados; (at Cuauhtémoc); 1D, 52C, 120, 121A; 6A; (at distance)	Del Valle Sur	Benito Juárez		March 10, 2021

==== Pueblo Santa Cruz Atoyac–Indios Verdes route ====
The route runs from Pueblo Santa Cruz Atoyac to Tlatelolco normally. As soon as it reaches Avenida Manuel González (Eje 2 Norte), the route detours towards Avenida de los Insurgentes. Starting at San Simón, the route shares the same stations Line 1 uses.

The branch was originally a temporary auxiliary line created to reduce the impact of the Mexico City Metro PCCI fire had on Mexico City Metro Line 3 in January 2021, then it was left permanently. Until 4 August 2023, it detoured at Avenida Mosqueta (Eje 1 Norte) and it serviced Buenavista and Manuel González stations.

Stations	Connections	Neighborhood(s)	Municipality	Picture	Date opened
Indios Verdes	101, 101A, 101B, 101D, 102, 107B (at distance), 108	Residencial Zacatenco	Gustavo A. Madero		June 19, 2005
Deportivo 18 de Marzo	15B	Lindavista; Tepeyac Insurgentes	Gustavo A. Madero		June 19, 2005
Euzkaro	15A, 15B	Magdalena de las Salinas; Industrial	Gustavo A. Madero		June 19, 2005
Potrero	25, 104; 15C	Capultitán; Guadalupe Insurgentes	Gustavo A. Madero		June 19, 2005
La Raza	Line 4 (under construction); 11A (at distance), 12 (at distance), 23, 27A, 103; 7D (at distance), 20C, 20D	Vallejo	Gustavo A. Madero		June 19, 2005
Circuito	200; 7D (at distance), 20A, 20D	Santa María Insurgentes	Cuauhtémoc		June 19, 2005
San Simón	20B (at distance)	Santa María Insurgentes; San Simón Tolnáhuac	Cuauhtémoc		June 19, 2005
Tlatelolco	10B	Nonoalco Tlatelolco	Cuauhtémoc		February 8, 2011

== Operator ==
Movilidad Integral de Vanguardia, SAPI de CV (MIV) is the sole operator of Line 3.
