= Eugenia metro station =

Mexico City Metro station

Eugenia
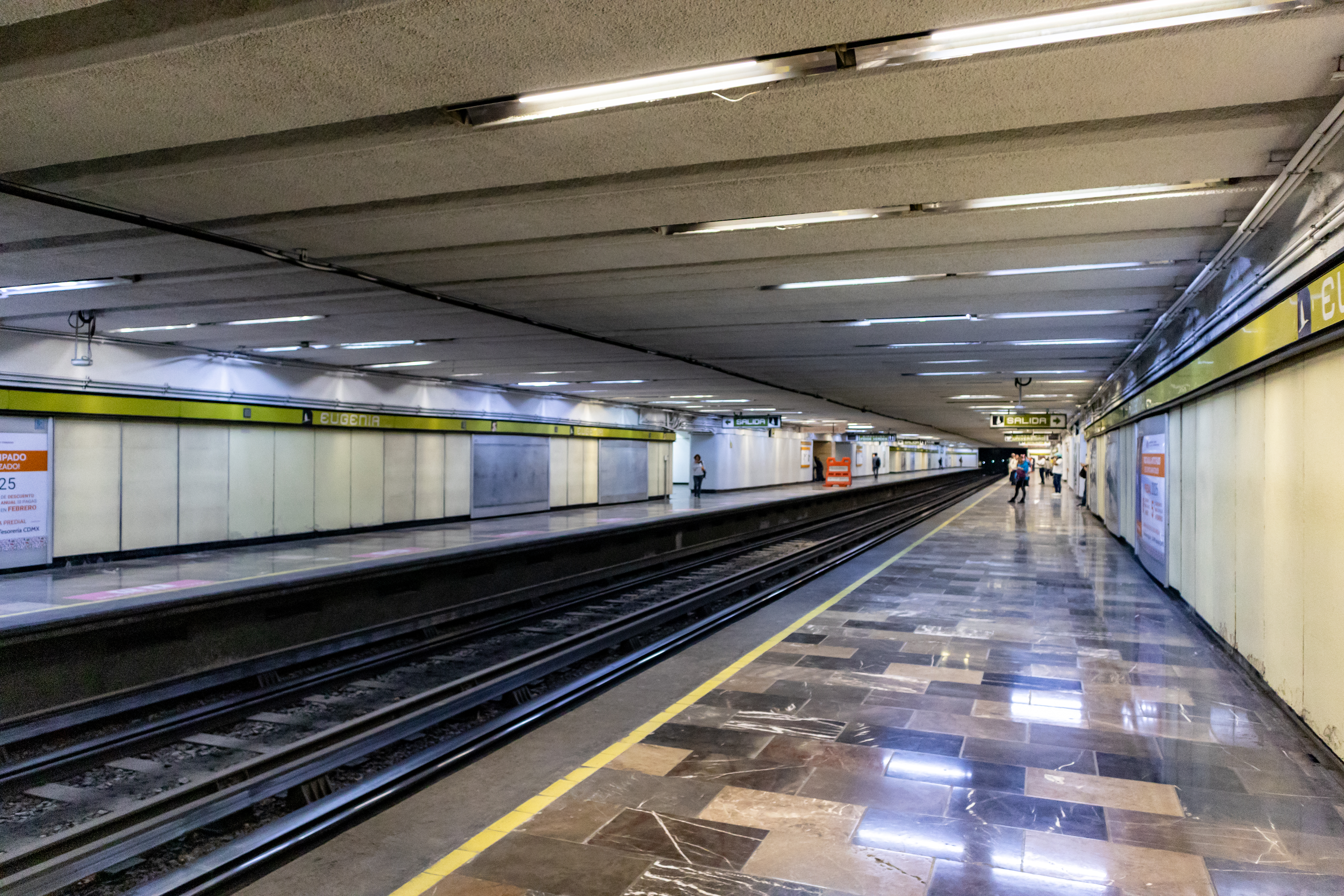
- Station platforms, 2025

General information
- Location: Cuauhtémoc Avenue and Eugenia Avenue; Benito Juárez, Mexico City; Mexico
- Coordinates: 19°23′10″N 99°9′26″W
- System: Mexico City Metro
- Owner: Government of Mexico City
- Operator: Sistema de Transporte Colectivo (STC)
- Platforms: 2 side platforms
- Tracks: 2
- Connections: Eugenia

Construction
- Structure type: Underground

Other information
- Status: In service

History
- Opened: 25 August 1980; 46 years ago

Passengers
- 2025: 4,182,163 (Note: The system's website counts only passenger entries into stations and does not include passengers passing through, transferring between lines, or exiting the station. The data here is limited to the most recent ten years to avoid excessive listings; earlier figures can be found in this page's history or on the Mexico City Metro website. To calculate the average daily ridership, the annual total is divided by 365 days (366 in leap years), with decimals omitted from the result. Each station per line is ranked individually, as the system counts transfer stations separately. The percentage change is calculated automatically using the data from the current year and the previous year.) ▼3.69%
- Rank: 126/195

Services
Preceding station	Mexico City Metro	Following station
Etiopía/Plaza de la Transparencia toward Indios Verdes	Line 3	División del Norte toward Universidad
Route map
Location
- Location within Mexico City
- Area map

Eugenia metro station (Note: Estación del Metro Eugenia. Spanish pronunciation: [euˈxenja].) is a station of the Mexico City Metro in the city's borough of Benito Juárez. It is an underground railway stop with two side platforms serving Line 3 (Olive Line), between Etiopía/Plaza de la Transparencia and División del Norte. It was opened on 25 August 1980, providing service north toward Indios Verdes and south toward Zapata.

Eugenia metro station services the colonias (neighborhoods) of Vertiz Narvarte and Del Valle, in the intersection of Avenida Cuauhtémoc and Avenida Eugenia. The station's name references the avenue, which in turn honors philanthropist Eugenia Ojeda de Castelló. Its pictogram depicts the silhouette of a stork, a bird associated with fertility, reflecting the meaning of the name Eugenia as "well-born".

Outside, there is the eponymous Metrobús station serving Line 3. In 2025, Eugenia metro station had an average daily ridership of 11,457 passenger entries, ranking it the 126th busiest stop in the network.

== Location and layout ==
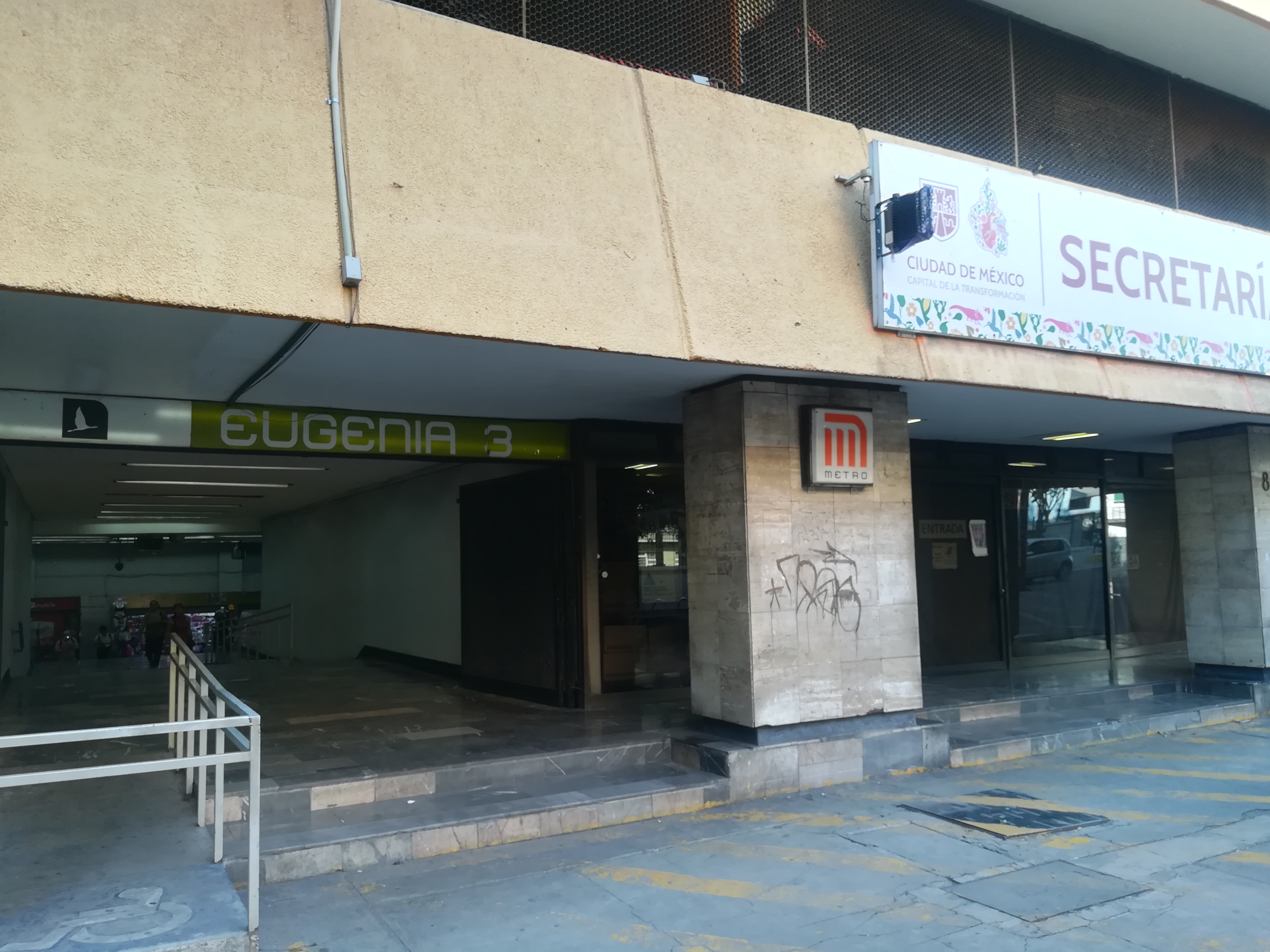
One of the station's entrances (pictured) is situated next to the Mexico City Secretariat of Economic Development building.

Eugenia is an underground metro station on Line 3 below Avenida Cuauhtémoc, in the Colonias ("neighborhoods") of Vertiz Narvarte and Del Valle, in the Benito Juárez borough, south-central Mexico City. The stop has two exits leading onto Avenida Cuauhtémoc: the eastern exit in Colonia Vertiz Narvarte and the western one in Colonia del Valle. Land use in the area is predominantly residential, with local services.

The station lies below the city's Secretariat of Economic Development building. Eugenia is located between Etiopía/Plaza de la Transparencia and División del Norte stations on the line. The area is serviced by the Metrobús bus rapid transit system (Line 3) at the eponymous Eugenia stop.

== History and construction ==
Line 3 of the Mexico City Metro was built by Ingeniería de Sistemas de Transportes Metropolitano, Electrometro, and Cometro, the latter being a subsidiary of Empresas ICA. The section including Eugenia station formed part of a southward extension from Centro Médico to Zapata, opened on 25 August 1980, with service running north to Indios Verdes and south to Zapata. The section between Eugenia and Etiopía/Plaza de la Transparencia station measures 950 meters (3,120 ft), while the opposite tunnel toward División del Norte station is 715 meters (2,346 ft) long.

The station formerly connected to Line O of the trolleybus system, which ran from San Antonio metro station to the Central de Abastos wholesale market.

=== Name and pictogram ===
Eugenia metro station is named after the nearby Avenida Eugenia, also known as Eje 5 Sur. José C. Castelló and his family, including his wife Eugenia Ojeda de Castelló, owned a quinta in the area. Ojeda was a philanthropist, and her husband requested that the city government name the street in her honor when the area's nomenclature system was established around 1920 and 1924. Although the Mexico City Metro has other stations named after women – including Isabel la Católica, Santa Anita, or Santa Marta – Eugenia is the only station in the system named after a Mexican woman. It is also the only station whose name is associated with a local person rather than a political or historical figure.

Eugenia means well-born, and the station's pictogram features a stork, a bird traditionally associated with fertility. The pictogram was designed by Lance Wyman, and it is one of the few in the system based on a European (specifically Ancient Greek) meaning. As of 2024, the Metrobús station is also one of the few stations named after Latin American women – the others being Josefa Ortiz de Domínguez, Luz Saviñón, and Manuela Sáenz.

=== Incidents ===
On 8 June 2023, part of the ceiling in the station's corridors collapsed following an afternoon of rain. According to an El Sol de México investigation in June 2024, Eugenia metro station is among the stations with the most sheets and wires used to cover leaks on Line 3, with four in total. At a northbound access, a leak reported in February of that year was patched, but was reported as detached the next month.

== Ridership ==
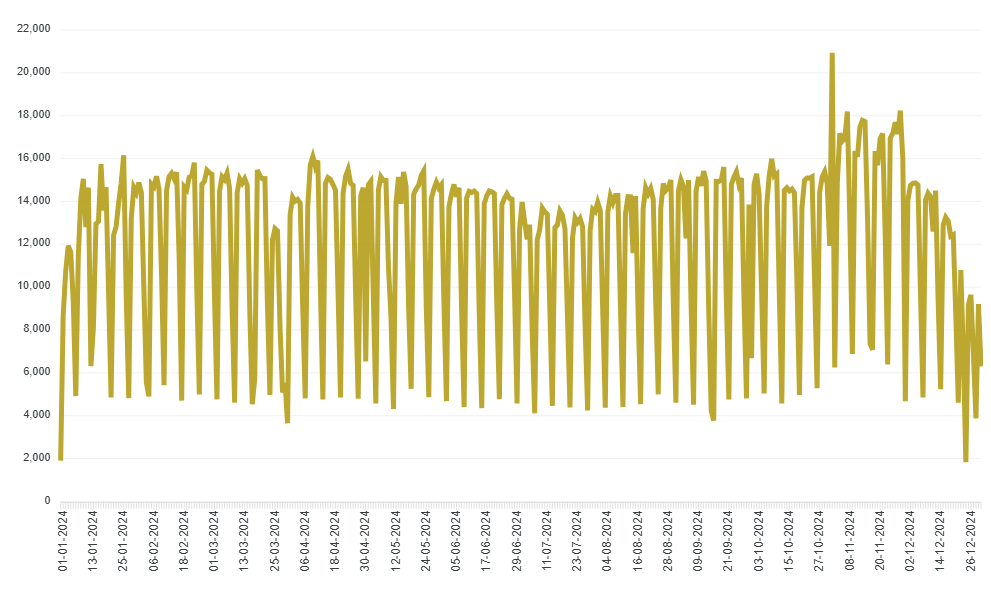
Daily ridership for Eugenia station in 2024

According to official data, before the impact of the COVID-19 pandemic, the station recorded between 18,200 and 18,400 average daily entries from 2016 to 2019. In 2025, it recorded 4,182,163 passenger entries, ranking 126th among the system's 195 stations.

Annual passenger ridership
Year	Ridership	Average daily	Rank	% change	Ref.
2025	4,182,163	11,457	126/195	−3.69%	
2024	4,342,498	11,864	115/195	+4.24%	
2023	4,165,742	11,412	109/195	+6.38%	
2022	3,915,748	10,728	111/195	+38.69%	
2021	2,823,476	7,735	115/195	−20.91%	
2020	3,569,934	9,753	104/195	−46.72%	
2019	6,700,579	18,357	97/195	+0.09%	
2018	6,694,794	18,341	95/195	+0.53%	
2017	6,659,665	18,245	96/195	−0.92%	
2016	6,721,700	18,365	99/195	+0.78%	
