= Parque Delta =

Shopping center in Mexico City

Coordinates: 19.4031°N 99.1542°W

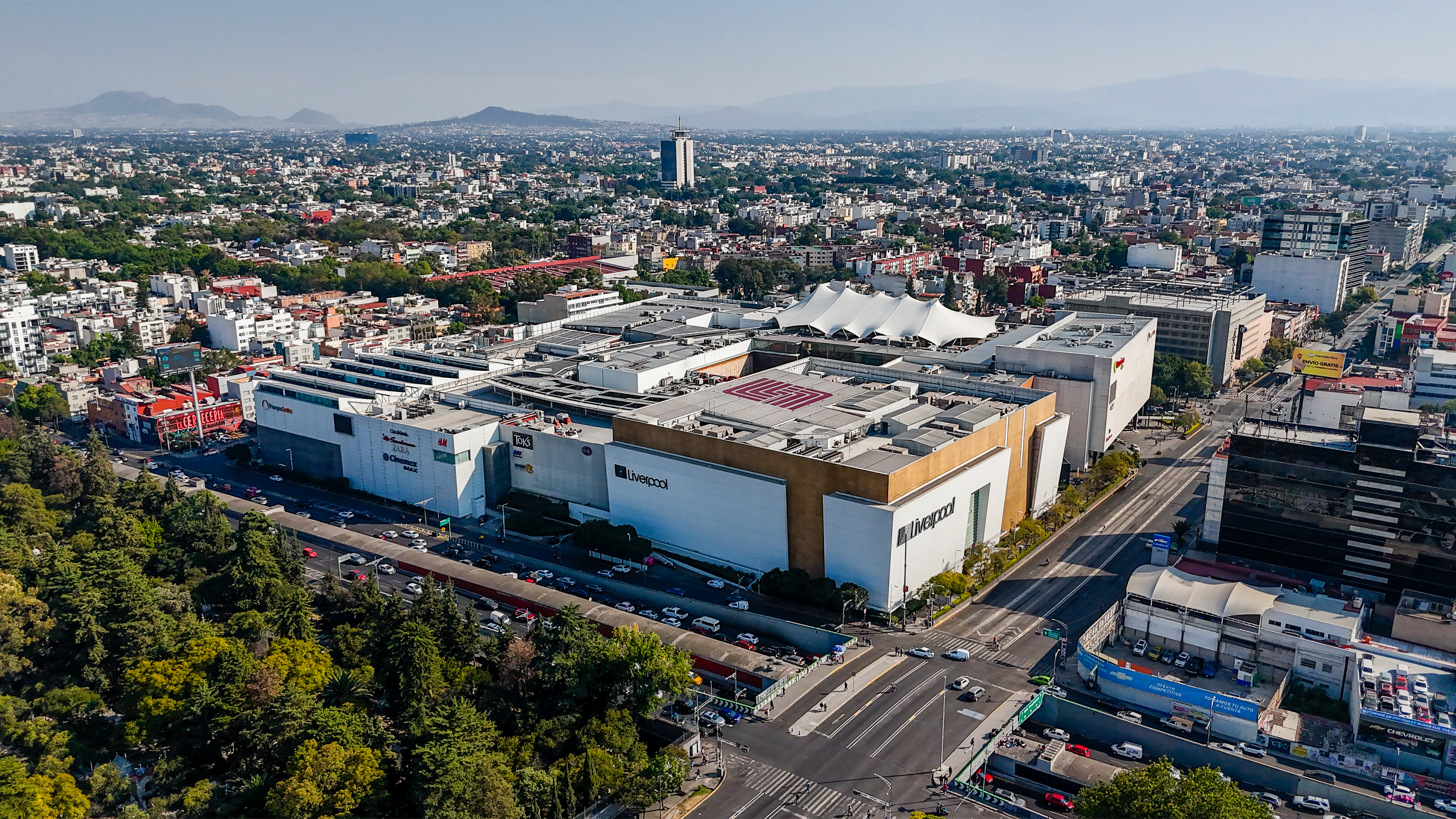
Exterior

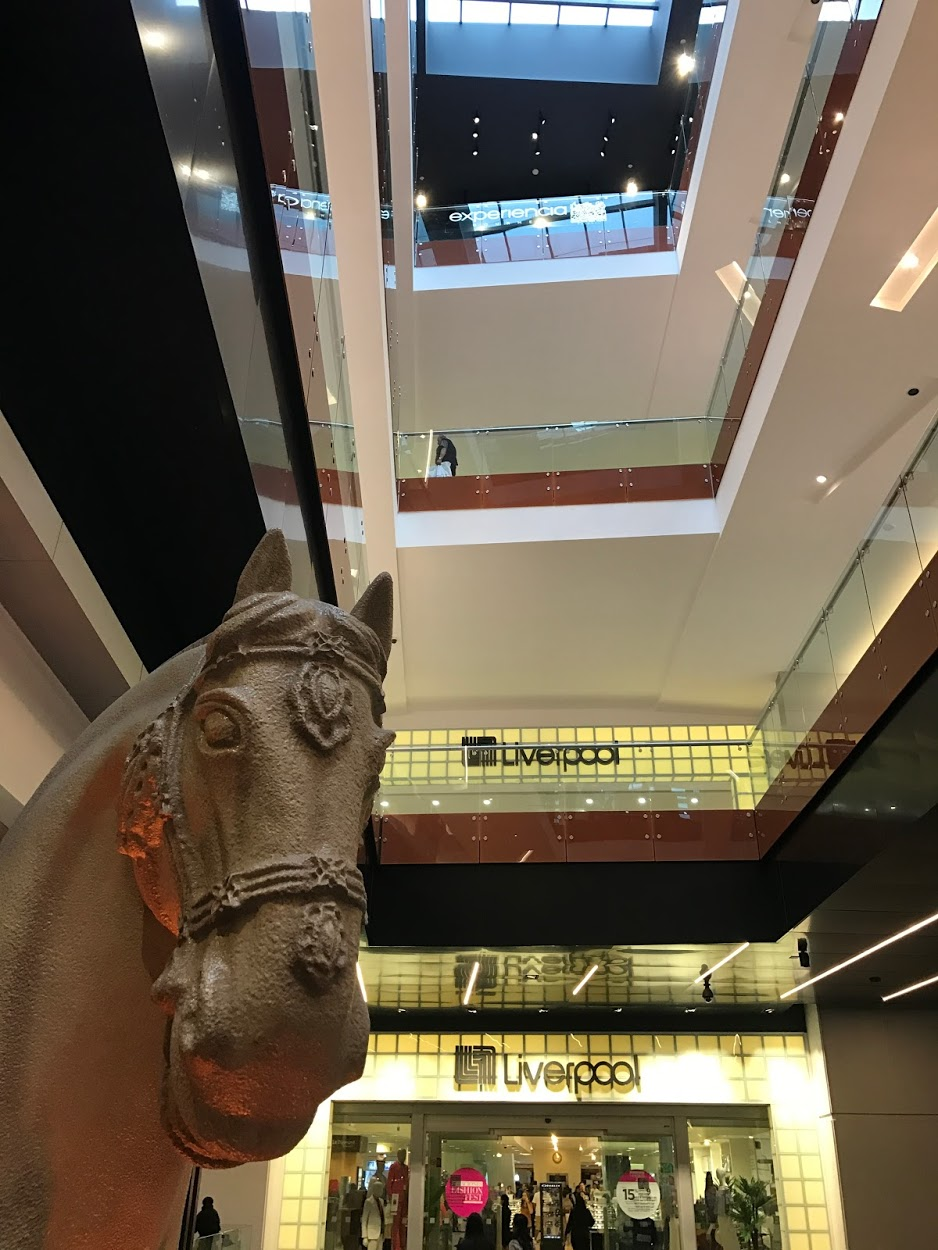
P.F. Chang's horse statue and Liverpool department store entrance in the new section of Parque Delta

Parque Delta is an enclosed shopping mall in Colonia Piedad Narvarte in Mexico City, at the southeast corner of Colonia Roma.

It contains 180,000 square metres (1,900,000 sq ft) of floor space, 70,224 square metres (755,880 sq ft) of which is rentable, while the land on which it is built measures 42,000 square metres (450,000 sq ft).

It is located at the intersection of Eje vial 1 Poniente Cuauhtémoc and the Viaducto freeway.

It was built on the site of the former Parque Delta Stadium.

It opened in 2005, was designed by Grupo Arquitech. It underwent an expansion in 2016 and is owned by Fibra Danhos, which owns several other large malls in Mexico including Toreo Parque Central and Reforma 222.

Anchors now include a four-story Liverpool department store, Soriana supermarket, Cinemex multicinemas (including VIP theaters), Sanborns, West Elm, Office Depot and The Home Store. There are also branches of Martí, Old Navy, C&A, H&M, Leftie's Gap, Zara, and Mango. There are many Alsea-run restaurants including two Starbucks, Chili's, P.F. Chang's, Italianni's and The Cheesecake Factory. In addition there is an Applebee's, Olive Garden, Red Lobster, Toks and Maison Kayser.

The complex received over 18 million visitors per year in 2013.
