= Colonia Narvarte =

Human settlement in Mexico

Coordinates: 19°23′30″N 99°09′25″W

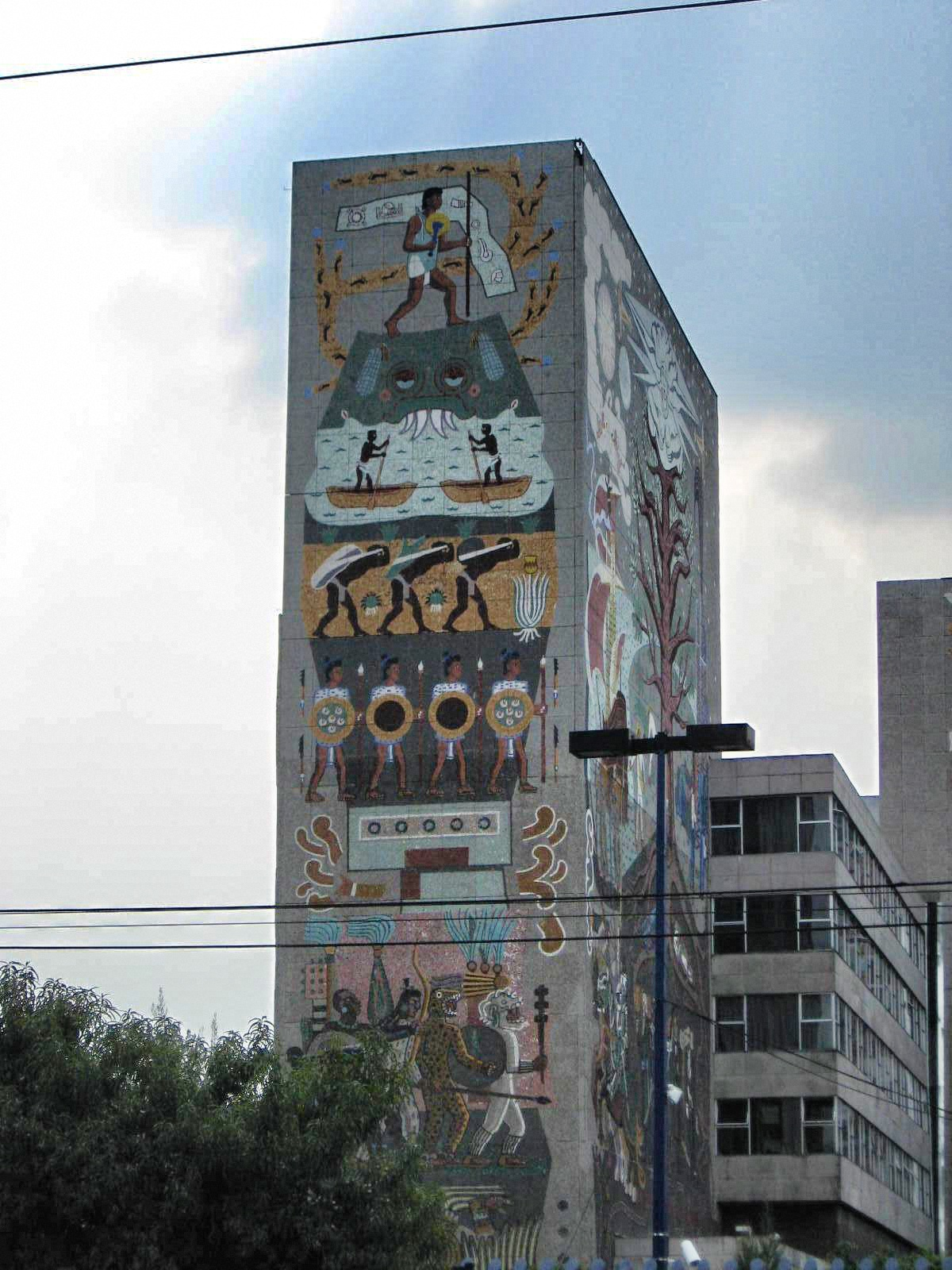
Secretariat of Communications and Transportation headquarters

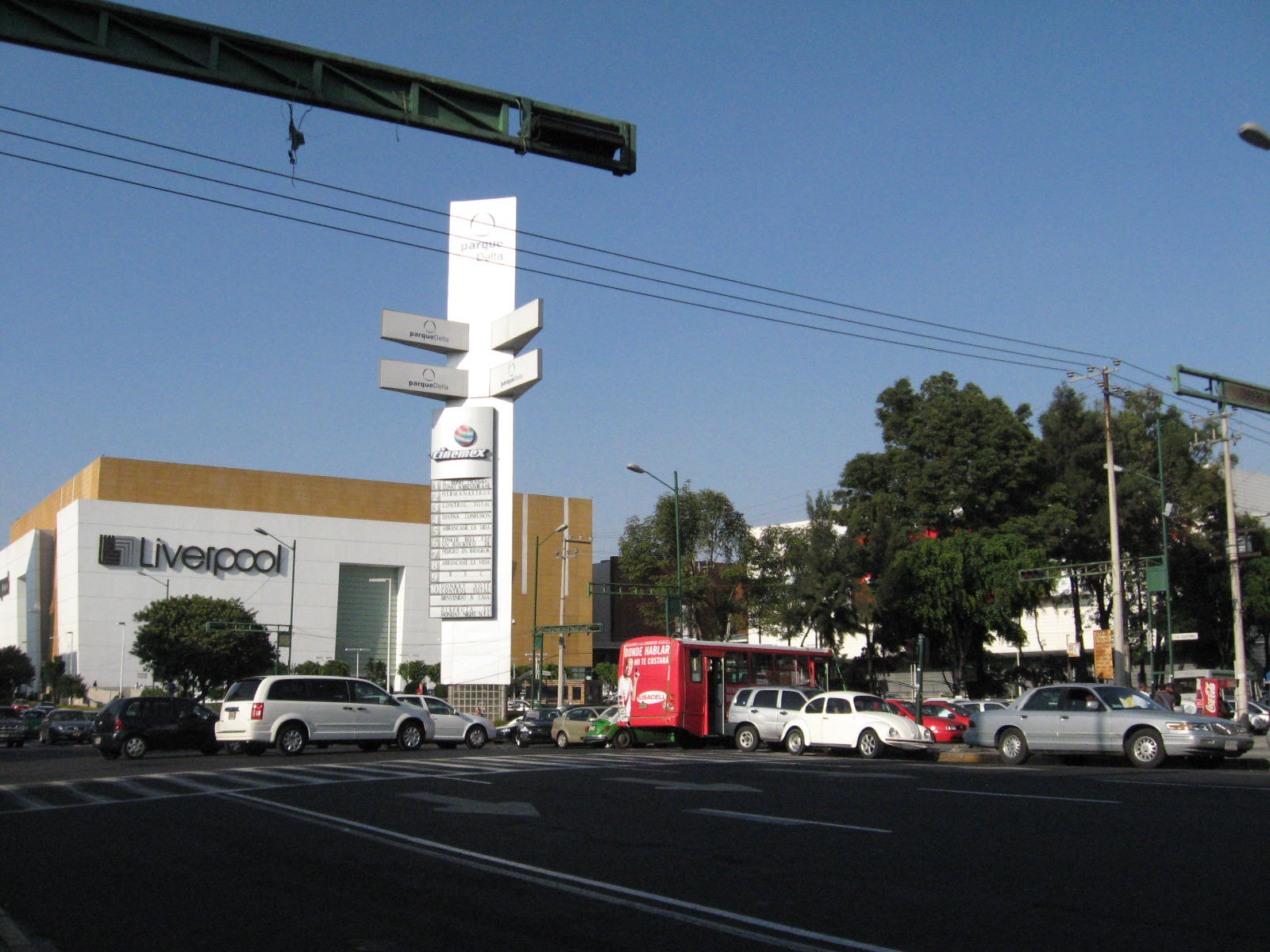
Parque Delta

Colonia Narvarte is the commonly used name for an area in the Benito Juárez borough of Mexico City.

== Geography ==
The area commonly known as Narvarte or Colonia Narvarte actually contains five officially recognized neighborhoods:

- Colonia Piedad Narvarte
- Colonia Atenor Salas
- Colonia Narvarte Poniente
- Colonia Narvarte Oriente
- Colonia Vértiz Narvarte

Narvarte is bordered on the west by Colonia del Valle, the north by Viaducto Miguel Alemán freeway, across which are Colonia Roma Sur, Colonia Buenos Aires and Colonia Doctores.

== History ==
Parroquia de Nuestra Señora de la Piedad on Avenida Obrero Mundial, Piedad Narvarte (2016)

The old village of La Piedad was located in Colonia Piedad Narvarte, but no traces remain. The area was developed starting in the 1940s, and Japanese, German and Lebanese immigrants moved here.

== Points of interest ==
The large Parque Delta shopping center is located in Colonia Piedad Narvarte. The headquarters of the Secretariat of Communications and Transportation with its famous murals is also located in the area.

== Transportation ==
The area is served by metro stations Metro Eugenia, Metro Etiopia and Metro División del Norte and by Mexico City Metrobús lines 2 and 3.
