= Colonia del Valle =

Coordinates: 19.389164°N 99.167668°W

Colonia Del Valle
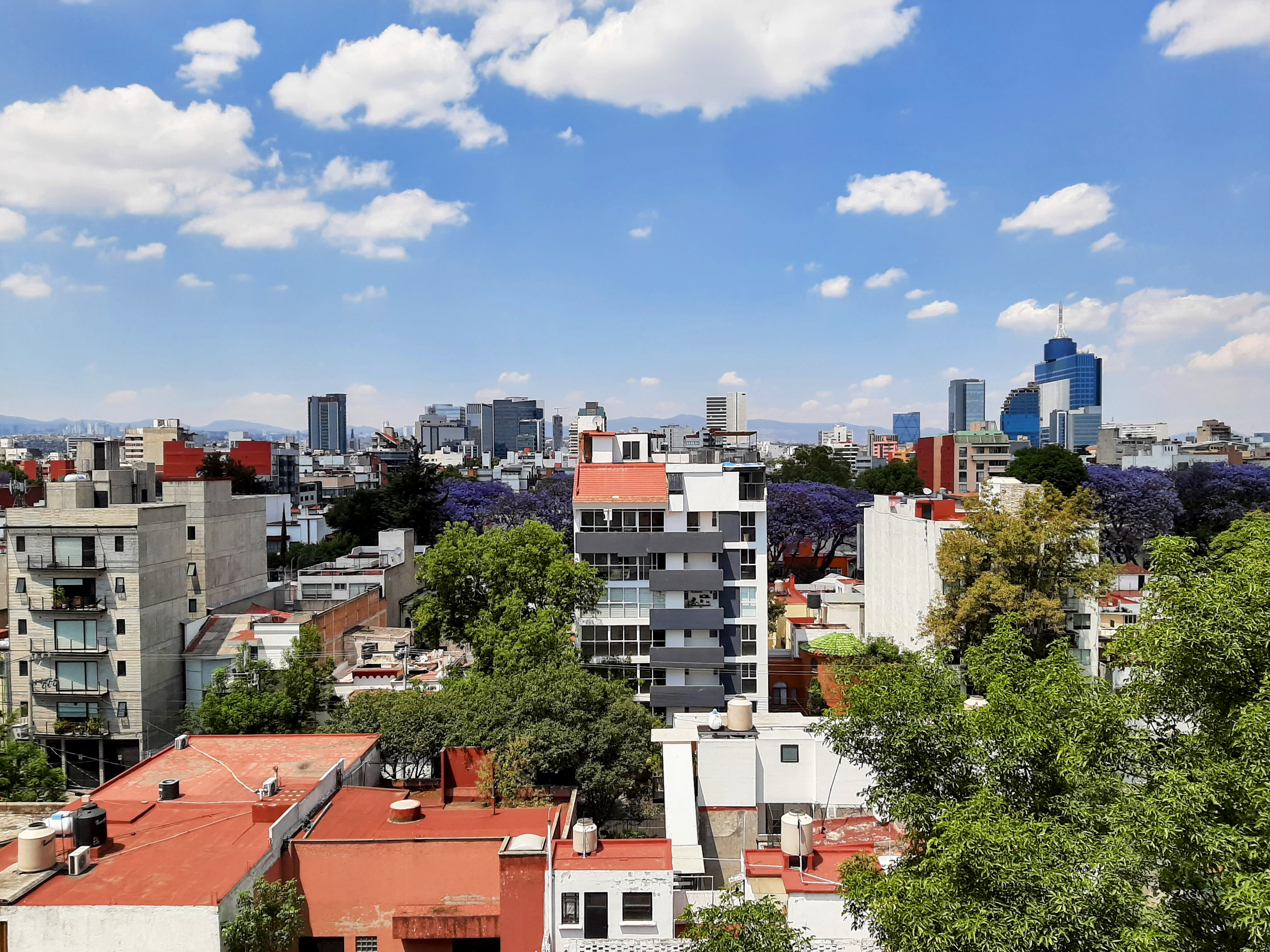
- A view of Colonia Del Valle (central area), the World Trade Center México on the background and Avenida de los Insurgentes skyline.
- Nickname: La Del Valle
- Del Valle neighborhood is located in the Benito Juárez borough. (Map showing location of the borough within Mexico City)
- Country: Mexico
- City: Mexico City
- Borough: Benito Juárez

Area
  - Total: 4.72 km^{2} (1.82 sq mi)

Population (1995)
  - Total: 62,475
- Website: www.coloniadelvalle.com.mx

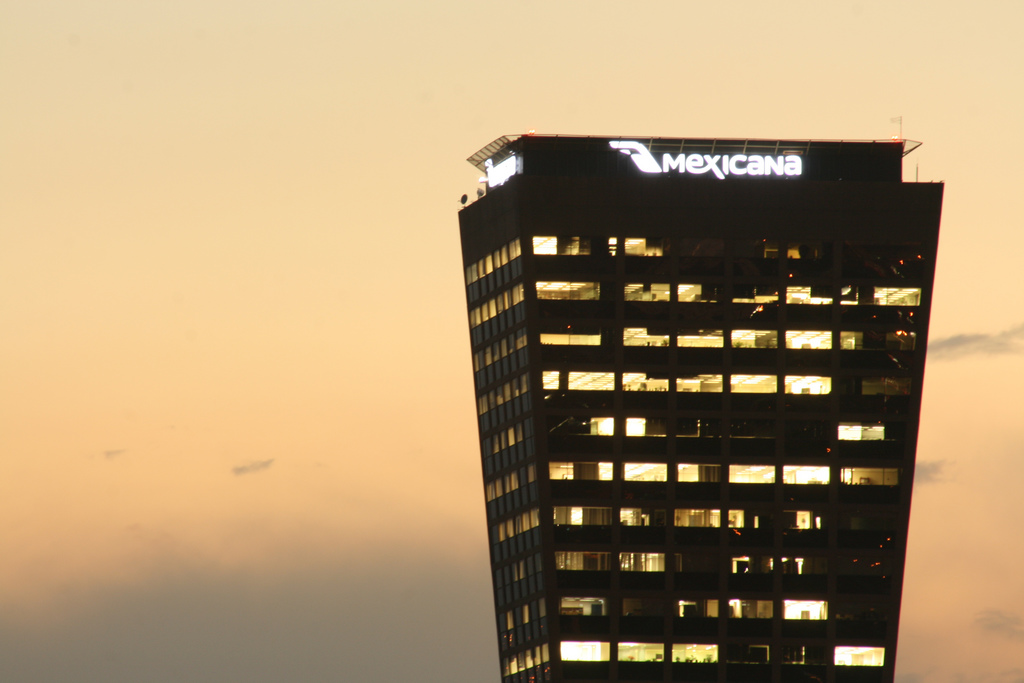
Torre AXA México, formerly Mexicana Tower

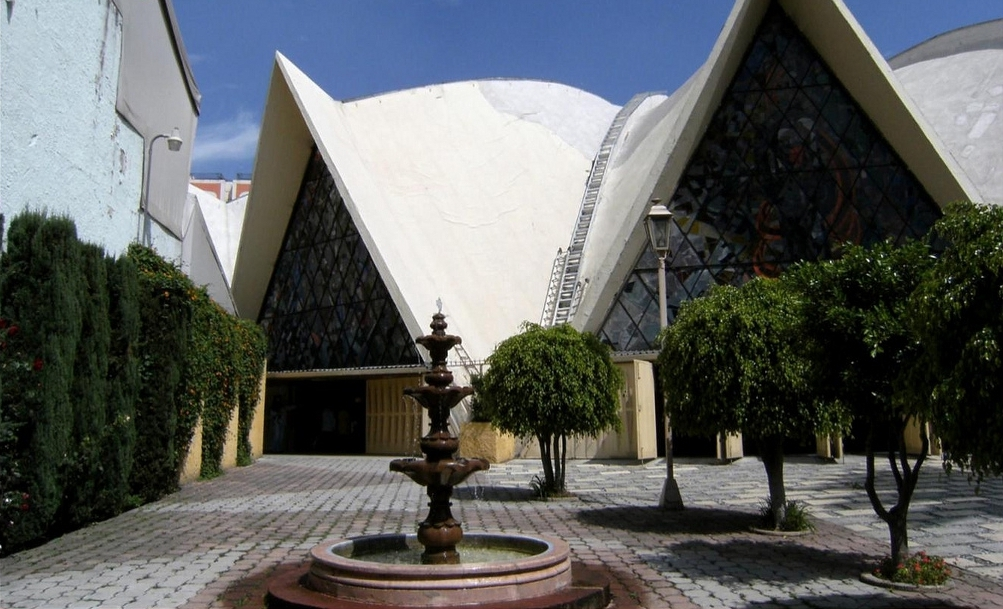
Templo de Santa Mónica

Colonia Del Valle (Spanish: Del Valle neighborhood) is a Colonia in the Benito Juárez borough of Mexico City. Founded as an aristocratic recreational neighborhood during the Porfiriato era, it has witnessed the various transformations of the capital over time. It includes a great number of parks, vast and tree-lined streets, prestigious shopping malls, and some city landmarks.

== History ==
At the beginning of the 20th century the ranches cultivated with alfalfa and fruit trees were divided, giving rise to Colonia Americana. Some neighborhood streets are named after these ranches and their fruit trees, others after Mexican philanthropists.

While serving as a streetcar route from Mexico City to Coyoacán it developed slowly until 1920, when it expanded and the Avenida de los Insurgentes was paved. Large-scale home and mansion construction started. The area also featured monument construction and green areas; one is the Parque Hundido, built on a former sand mine.

In the 1960s the area was as fully developed as many other neighborhoods of equal purchasing power on its borders. Commercial development included two major facilities, Liverpool Insurgentes opening in 1962 and the country's first shopping center, University Plaza, in 1969.

In 1978 the city built the Ejes viales, a system of wide, one-way roads criss-crossing the city, and with this Del Valle was transformed radically and permanently, its tree-lined boulevards with green medians transformed into quasi-freeways. Ejes 4, 5, 6, 7, and 8 south crossed from east to west and 1, 2, and 3 from south to north. This drove many families to look for a quieter place to live and began the process of redeveloping the area. Mansions were replaced by apartment buildings, offices or schools.

Crime statistics from 2009 showed that Colonia del Valle was the second most crime-ridden neighborhood in Mexico City, sharing the top 10 list with notorious neighborhoods Tepito and Colonia Doctores. However, 2012 statistics do not place Del Valle on the list of the top 6 most crime-ridden neighborhoods.

== Transportation ==
Major roads running through the neighborhood include: Avenida Insurgentes, Cuauhtemoc, Northern Division, University, Félix Cuevas, José María Rico, and Xola.

Mexico City Metro Line 3 has several stations in the vicinity: Etiopía, Eugenia, División del Norte, Zapata and Coyoacán. Mexico City Metrobús (BRT) Line 2 stops at Amores (corner of Xola).

== Geography ==
Del Valle is bounded by the streets of:

- Viaducto Miguel Alemán to the north,
- Cuauhtémoc and Universidad to the east,
- Rio Mixcoac - Barranca del Muerto to the south and
- Insurgentes Avenue to the west.

Adjacent neighborhoods include

- Colonia Nápoles, Ciudad de los Deportes, Noche Buena and San Borja to the west,
- Escandón to the northwest,
- Colonia Roma Sur and Piedad Narvarte to the north,
- Colonia Narvarte, Vértiz Narvarte and Letrán Valle to the east, and
- Tlacomecatl del Valle, Miguel Alemán, Xoco and Santa Cruz Atoyac to the south.

== Architecture ==
The architecture includes large mansions in Californian mission revival Art Deco style and, to a lesser extent, surviving examples of Porfiriato. At the end of the 1960s many small skyscrapers, both commercial and residential, were built, making the area one of the most densely populated of Mexico City. Housing complexes were also built.

It houses churches such as the Temple of the Immaculate Heart of Mary, and buildings dating from the period of colonization and conquest between park Tlacoquemécatl including the Temple of San Lorenzo and the Xochimanca, cultural areas and parks like the Sunken Park or Mariscal Sucre Park, the French Kiosk, art galleries, libraries, auditoriums Polyforum Cultural Siqueiros, Plaza México, and Estadio Azul stadium.

== Religious buildings ==
The religious structures found in the Del Valle include the Templo del Purísimo Corazón de María (Parish of the Most Pure Heart of Mary) at the corner of Gabriel Mancera number 415. It was built in the early 20th century. In 1996, several scenes of the film Romeo + Juliet were filmed at the church. Mexican singer Luis Miguel was baptized there.

The Temple of San Lorenzo Xochimanca, located in the park of the same name, a.k.a. Parque Popular, was built in the 16th century.

The Parroquia del Señor del Buen Despacho, located in Parque Tlacoquemécatl, dates from the 18th century. The Temple of Santo Tomás Actipan, built in 1897, is located at the corner of Buffalo and Tigre streets.

The Temple of Santa Monica, with the signature "cáscaro" thin-shell structure of its architect Félix Candela, on Fresa Street opposite the park of San Lorenzo, was built in 1962. The Parish of Divine Providence in Adolfo Prieto Street was constructed between 1968 and 1974.

== Education ==
Within the Del Valle are two of the oldest educational institutions in the country; the College and Institute of Mexico and its Centro Universitario Mexico, and the Colegio Simón Bolívar. Graduates of these schools include Octavio Paz and Germán Dehesa.

International schools include Colegio Nuevo Continente and Tomas Alva Edison.

== Notable people ==
- Helena Espinosa Berea (ca.1895 - ca.1960), Mexican academic
- María Ernestina Larráinzar Córdoba (1854-1925), Mexican writer, novelist, teacher, religious order founder
