= San Lorenzo Xochimanca =

Hacienda in Mexico City, Mexico

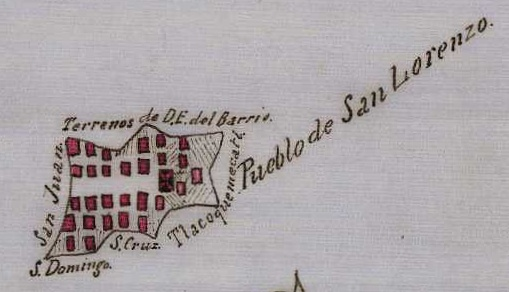
San Lorenzo Xochimanca as it appeared on a map of the Municipality of Tacubya (1897)

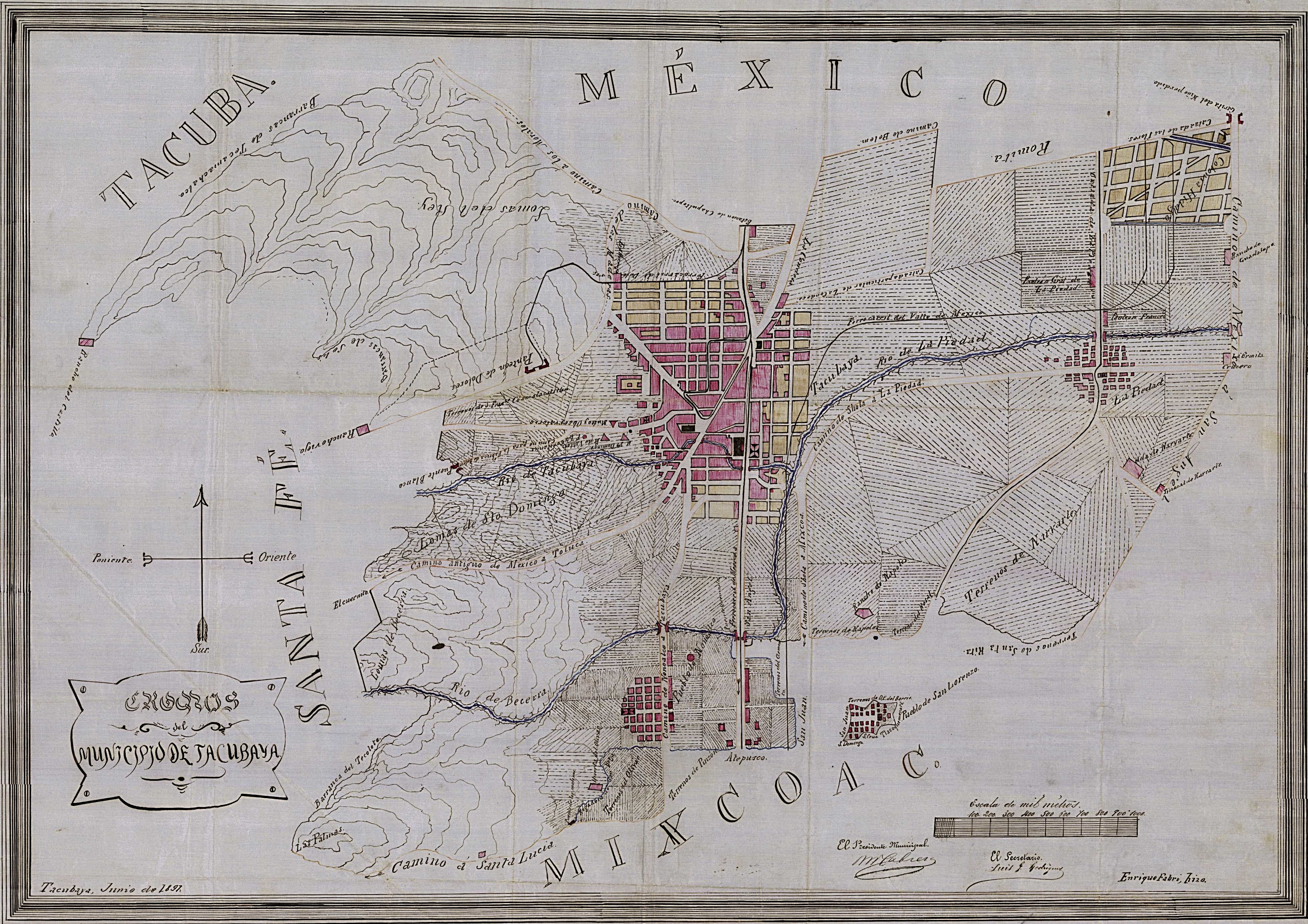
San Lorenzo Xochimanca appears above the "AC" of "MIXCOAC"

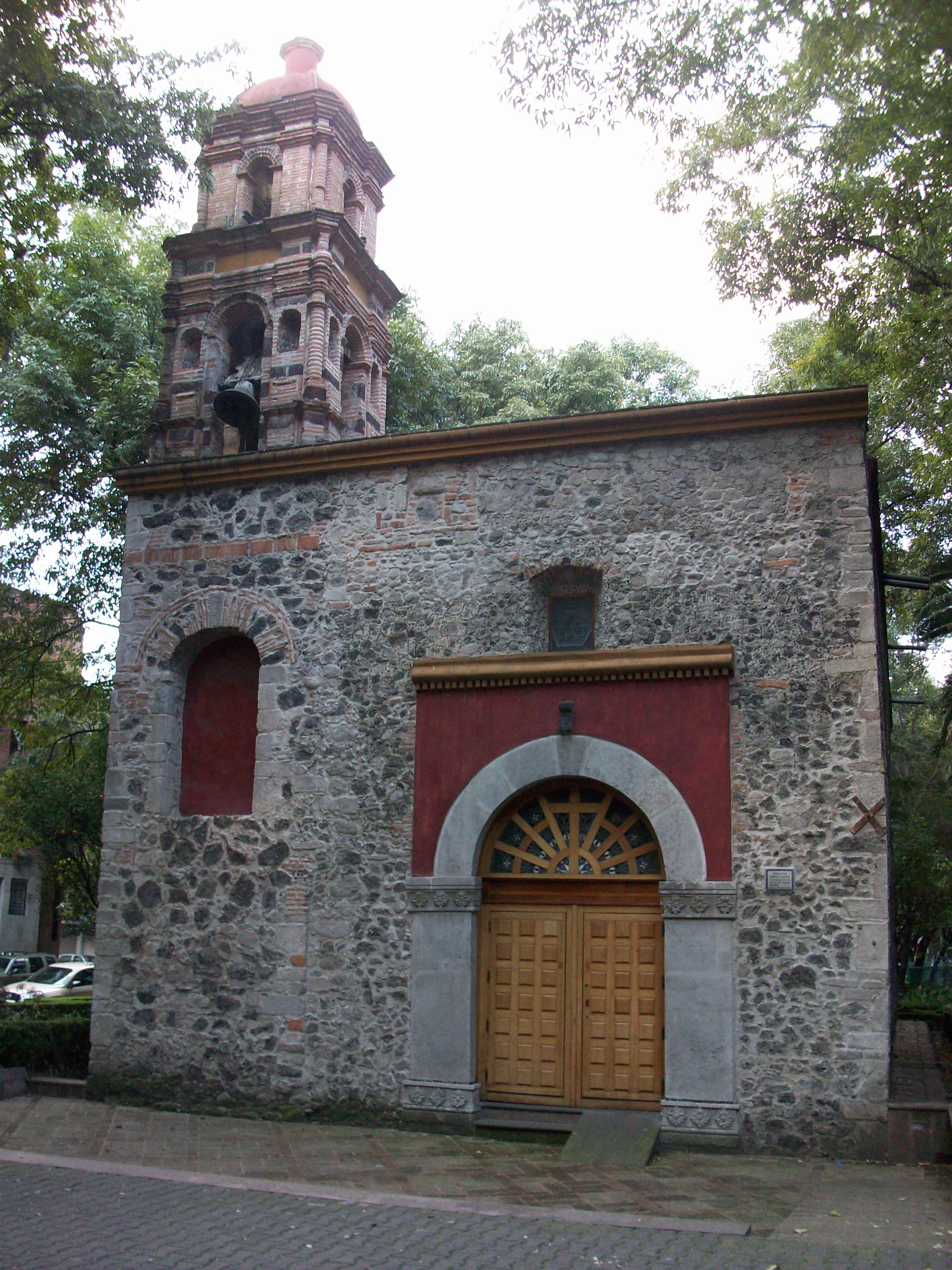
San Lorenzo Chapel, Colonia del Valle

San Lorenzo Xochimanca (Xochimanca in Náhuatl, "place where flowers are offered") was a pre-Hispanic village and hacienda located in what is now the Colonia del Valle area of Mexico City.

== San Lorenzo Chapel ==
The San Lorenzo Chapel, or Templo de San Lorenzo Xochimanca (also known as the Templo de San Lorenzo Mártir), was built in the 16th century and is still standing, built of brick and volcanic stone. Its bell tower was built in "Mixcoac" style with copper-colored bricks.

It was declared a National Monument of Mexico in the 1930s. At its base a cemetery operated until the early 20th century.
