= Helena Espinosa Berea =

Mexican educator (c. 1895 – c. 1960)

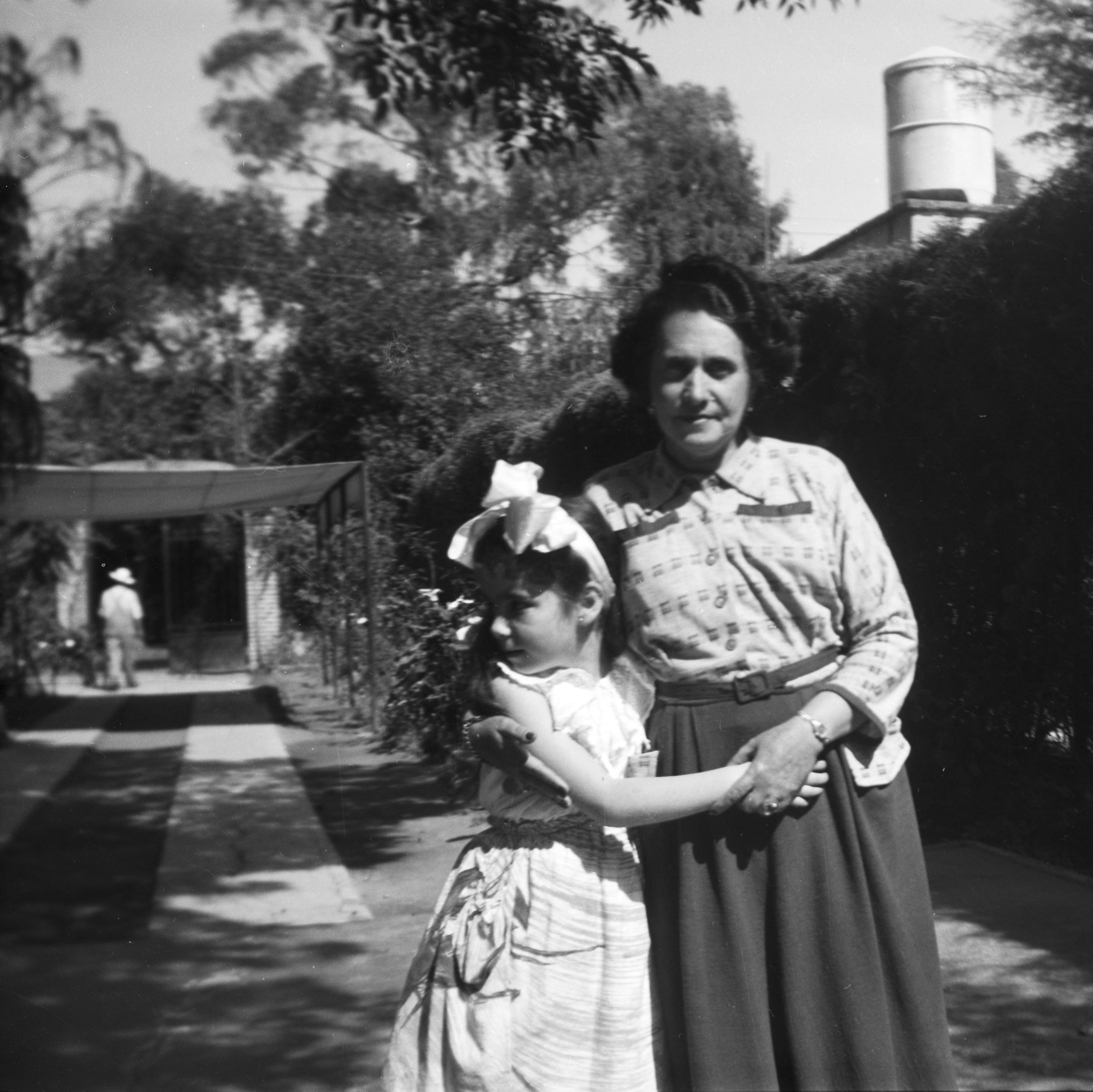
Helena Espinosa Berea, together with a student, in her kindergarten, in the early 1950s.

Helena Espinosa Berea (also known as Elena Espinosa Berea; c. 1895 – c. 1960) was a Mexican academic. An active educator for 50 years, she was a pioneer in the studies and practice of Early childhood education. While the education minister Justo Sierra tried to push for it during the Porfiriato, it was not until after the Mexican Revolution that pre-school education really developed. Espinosa Berea participated in the process.

== Biography ==
Helena (or Elena) Espinosa Berea was born in Mexico City, around 1895. She studied at the Escuela Nacional de Maestros for a career as an educator.

After working in the annex to the Normal School, she was commissioned by teacher Rosaura Zapata to find a suitable place to establish a kindergarten. Although the first kindergartens were opened around 1883, it was not until after the revolution that they became generally accepted within the education system. Zapata collaborated with Justo Sierra, with José Vasconcelos and other Secretaries of Public Education to found schools in different parts of the country. By 1928, Zapata called upon Espinosa Berea to establish a kindergarten in the Colonia del Valle, which was then a growing population area of Mexico City. She opened Brígida Alfaro on Mier and Pesado streets. She named the school after the teacher, Alfaro, who died in 1925. In this way, she was a pioneer of early childhood education in Mexico. Espinosa Berea served as director until 1949, when she retired.

After her retirement, she opened her own kindergarten in the same neighborhood of Valle, at 415 Morena Street. She named the school after herself, "Helena Espinosa Berea", and directed it until her death, in Mexico City, ca.1960. The Elena Espinosa Berea Garden is named in her honor.
