= Etiopía/Plaza de la Transparencia metro station =

Mexico City metro station

Etiopía/Plaza de la Transparencia
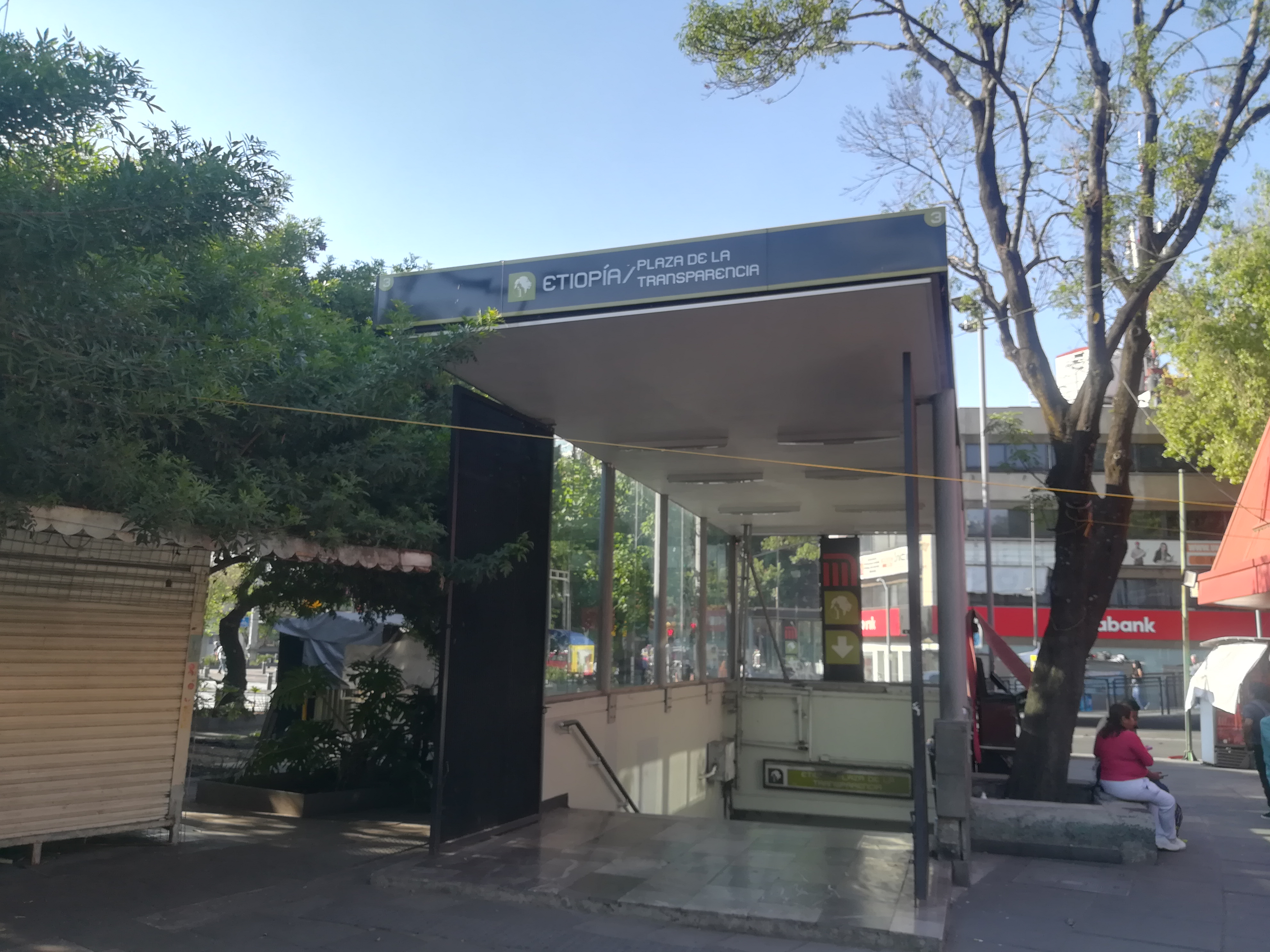

General information
- Location: Colonia Narvarte, Benito Juárez; Mexico City; Mexico
- Coordinates: 19°23′44″N 99°09′23″W
- System: Mexico City Metro
- Platforms: 2 side platforms
- Tracks: 2
- Connections: Etiopía/Plaza de la Transparencia; Etiopía/Plaza de la Transparencia

Construction
- Structure type: Underground
- Platform levels: 1
- Parking: No
- Cycle facilities: No
- Accessible: Partial

History
- Opened: 25 August 1980; 46 years ago
- Former names: Etiopía

Passengers
- 2025: 7,756,400 (Note: The data here is limited to the most recent ten years to avoid excessive listings; earlier figures can be found in this page's history or on the Mexico City Metro website. To calculate the average daily ridership, the annual total is divided by 365 days (366 in leap years), with decimals omitted from the result. Each station per line is ranked individually, as the system counts transfer stations separately. The percentage change is calculated automatically using the data from the current year and the previous year.) ▼2.3%
- Rank: 49/195

Services
Preceding station	Mexico City Metro	Following station
Centro Médico toward Indios Verdes	Line 3	Eugenia toward Universidad
Route map
Location
- Location within Mexico City
- Area map

Etiopía/Plaza de la Transparencia (Spanish pronunciation; formerly Etiopía) is a metro station on the Mexico City Metro. It is located in the Benito Juárez borough of Mexico City.

== General information ==
The station logo depicts the head of a lion, a symbol of Ethiopia. Its name comes from the Plaza Etiopía, a traffic circle at the same location before the construction of the subway station. The traffic circle was named to show Mexico's support for an independent Ethiopia after the Italian invasion of Ethiopia. There is a corresponding Mexico Square in the Ethiopian capital city of Addis Ababa. Mexico Square is also a station on the Addis Ababa Light Rail.

Metro Etiopía / Plaza de la Transparencia is underneath the intersection of Avenida Xola, Avenida Cuauhtemoc, Cumbres de Maltrata street and Diagonal de San Antonio. It serves Narvarte neighbourhood.

On March 27, 2009, the station name was changed to Etiopía / Plaza de la Transparencia (Ethiopia / Transparency Square), as the Instituto Federal de Acceso a la Información Pública (Federal Institute of Public Information Access) was near the station at the time, and so it would fit the name of the closest Metrobús station.

=== Ridership ===
Annual passenger ridership
Year	Ridership	Average daily	Rank	% change	Ref.
2025	7,756,400	21,250	49/195	−2.30%
2024	7,939,065	21,691	45/195	+2.37%
2023	7,755,607	21,248	48/195	+15.49%
2022	6,715,640	18,399	52/195	+43.09%
2021	4,693,331	12,858	56/195	−23.28%
2020	6,117,488	16,714	42/195	−43.80%
2019	10,885,701	29,823	43/195	−1.99%
2018	11,106,302	30,428	41/195	+1.97%
2017	10,892,033	29,841	43/195	−1.48%
2016	11,055,480	30,206	44/195	+1.56%

== Exits ==
- Northwest: Eje 4 Sur Xola, Colonia Narvarte
- Southwest: Anaxágoras, Colonia Narvarte
- Southeast: Cumbres de Maltrata, Colonia Narvarte
- Northeast: Eje 4 Sur Xola, Colonia Narvarte

== Gallery ==
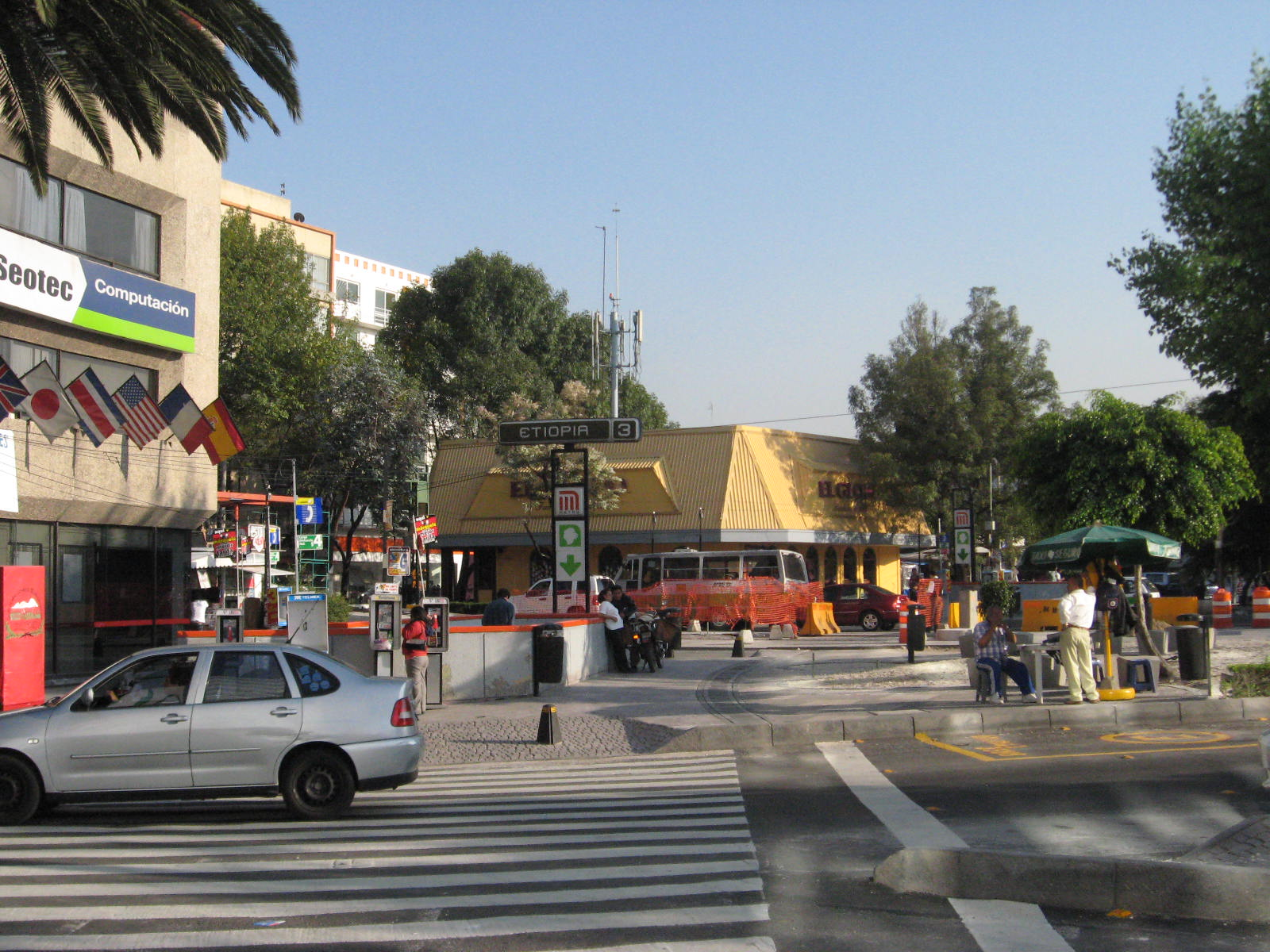
Entrance to Metro Etiopía / Plaza de la Transparencia

Intersection under which the station is located.

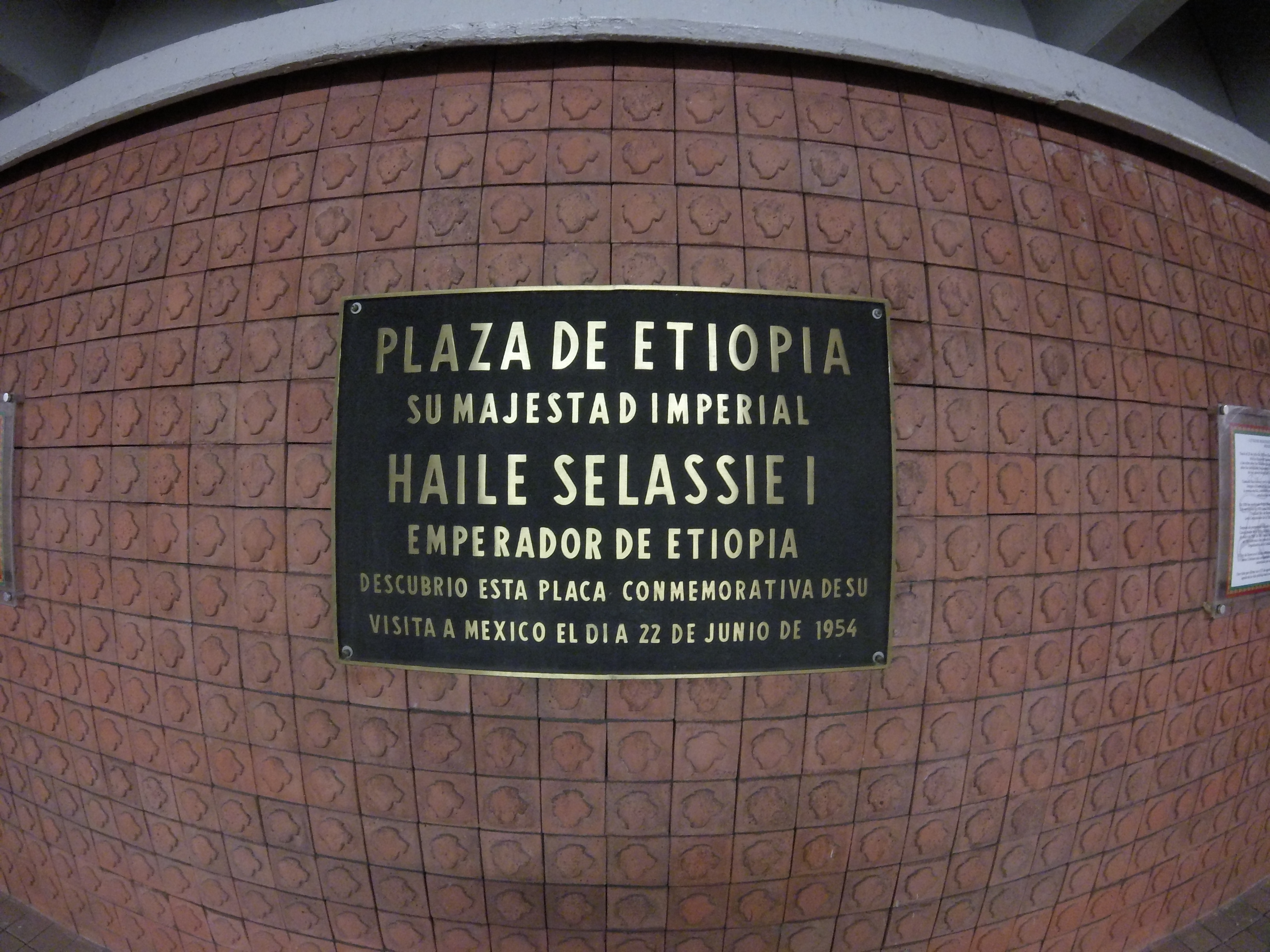
Plaque about Haile Selassie visit placed originally at Ethiopia Square in 1954 now at the station facilities.
