= División del Norte metro station =

Mexico City metro station

División del Norte
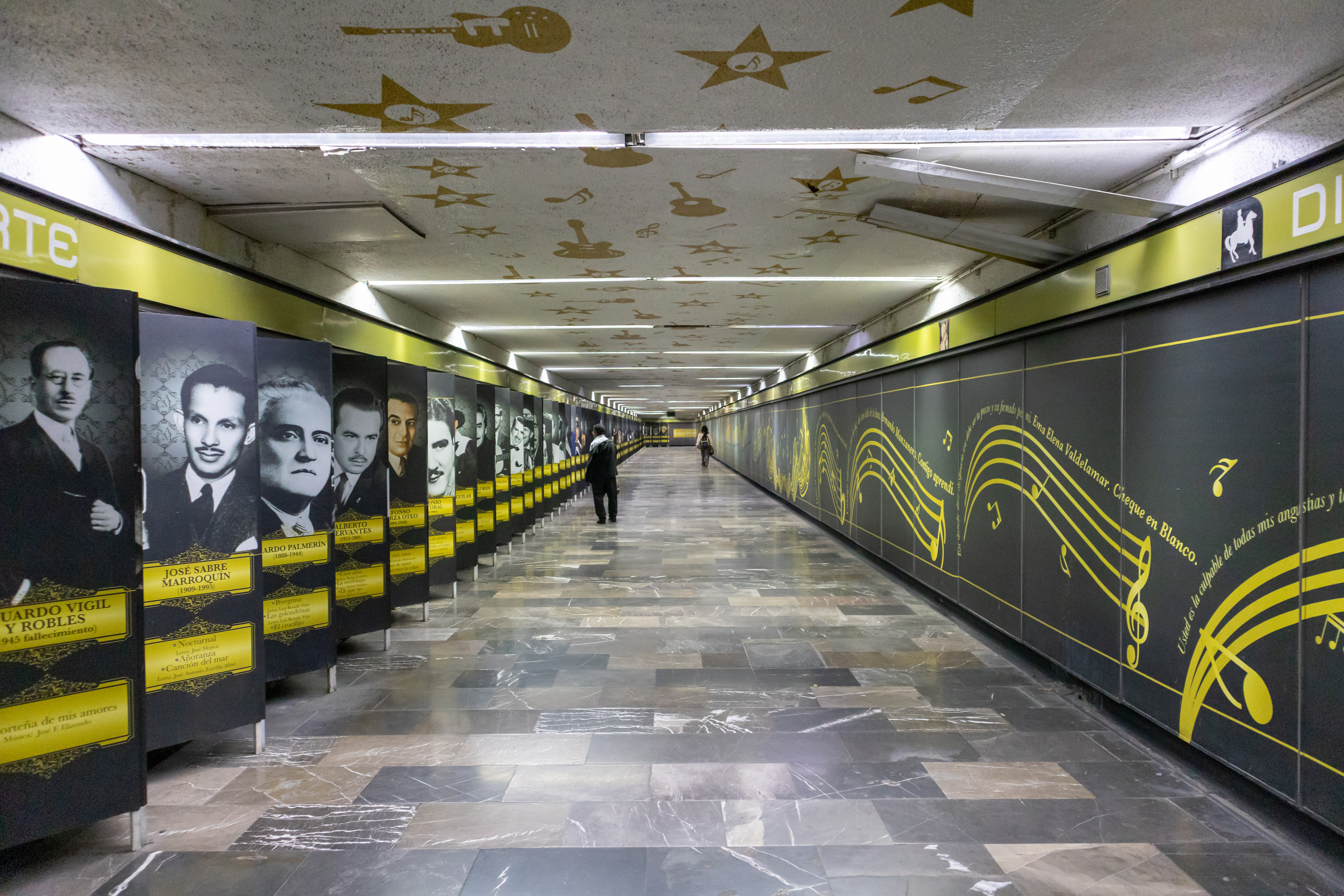
- The station hall in 2025. Its walls feature a musical design and display the biographies of numerous Mexican musicians.

General information
- Location: División del Norte Avenue, Cuauhtémoc Avenue and Universidad Avenue; Benito Juárez, Mexico City; Mexico
- Coordinates: 19°22′48″N 99°09′32″W
- System: Mexico City Metro
- Owner: Government of Mexico City
- Operator: Sistema de Transporte Colectivo (STC)
- Platforms: 2 side platforms
- Tracks: 2
- Connections: División del Norte

Construction
- Structure type: Underground

Other information
- Status: In service

History
- Opened: 25 August 1980; 46 years ago

Passengers
- 2025: 4,557,795 (Note: The system's website counts only passenger entries into stations and does not include passengers passing through, transferring between lines, or exiting the station. The data here is limited to the most recent ten years to avoid excessive listings; earlier figures can be found in this page's history or on the Mexico City Metro website. To calculate the average daily ridership, the annual total is divided by 365 days (366 in leap years), with decimals omitted from the result. Each station per line is ranked individually, as the system counts transfer stations separately. The percentage change is calculated automatically using the data from the current year and the previous year.) ▲1.87%
- Rank: 115/195

Services
Preceding station	Mexico City Metro	Following station
Eugenia toward Indios Verdes	Line 3	Zapata toward Universidad
Route map
Location
- Location within Mexico City
- Area map

División del Norte metro station (Note: Estación del Metro División del Norte. Spanish pronunciation: [diβiˈsjon del ˈnoɾte]. The name of the station literally means "Northern Division" in Spanish.) is a station of the Mexico City Metro in the city's borough of Benito Juárez. It is an underground railway stop with two side platforms serving Line 3 (Olive Line), between Eugenia and Zapata. It was opened on 25 August 1980, providing service north toward Indios Verdes and south toward Zapata.

División del Norte metro station services the colonias (neighborhoods) of Letrán Valle, Santa Cruz Atoyac, and Del Valle, in the intersection of Avenida División del Norte, Avenida Cuauhtémoc, and Avenida Universidad. The station's name references the avenue, which in turn honors the armed faction of the same name formed during the outbreak of the Mexican Revolution (1910–1920). Its pictogram depicts the revolutionary Pancho Villa riding a horse, who also formed part of the division, whose equestrian statue is nearby the station.

Inside, the station features a cultural display showcasing the biographies of numerous Mexican musicians. It also has a karaoke machine and a piano for visitors to use, although it no longer works. There is also a mural titled Encuentro de culturas by Graziella Scotese. Outside, there is the eponymous Metrobús station serving Line 3. In 2025, División del Norte metro station had an average daily ridership of 12,487 passenger entries, ranking it the 115th busiest stop in the network.

== Location and layout ==
División del Norte is an underground metro station on Line 3 at the intersection of Avenida Cuauhtémoc, Avenida División del Norte, and Avenida Universidad. It serves the Colonias ("neighborhoods") of Letrán Valle, Santa Cruz Atoyac, and Del Valle, in the Benito Juárez borough, south-central Mexico City.

División del Norte stop is located between Eugenia and Zapata stations on the line. The area is serviced by the Metrobús bus rapid transit system (Line 3) at the eponymous División del Norte stop.

The stop has five exits. The northeastern and southeastern exits lead to Colonia Letrán Valle along Avenida División del Norte. The former is located at the corner of Calle Matías Romero Oriente, and the latter at the corner of Calle Chichén Itza. The northwestern exit also leads to Avenida División del Norte, but in Colonia Santa Cruz Atoyac. The southern exit leads to Avenida Cuauhtémoc and Avenida Universidad in the same neighborhood. The final exit is located to the southwest, leading to Calle Matías Romero Poniente in Colonia del Valle.

Due to the presence of multiple major avenues in the area, property values are relatively high near División del Norte station.

=== Landmarks ===
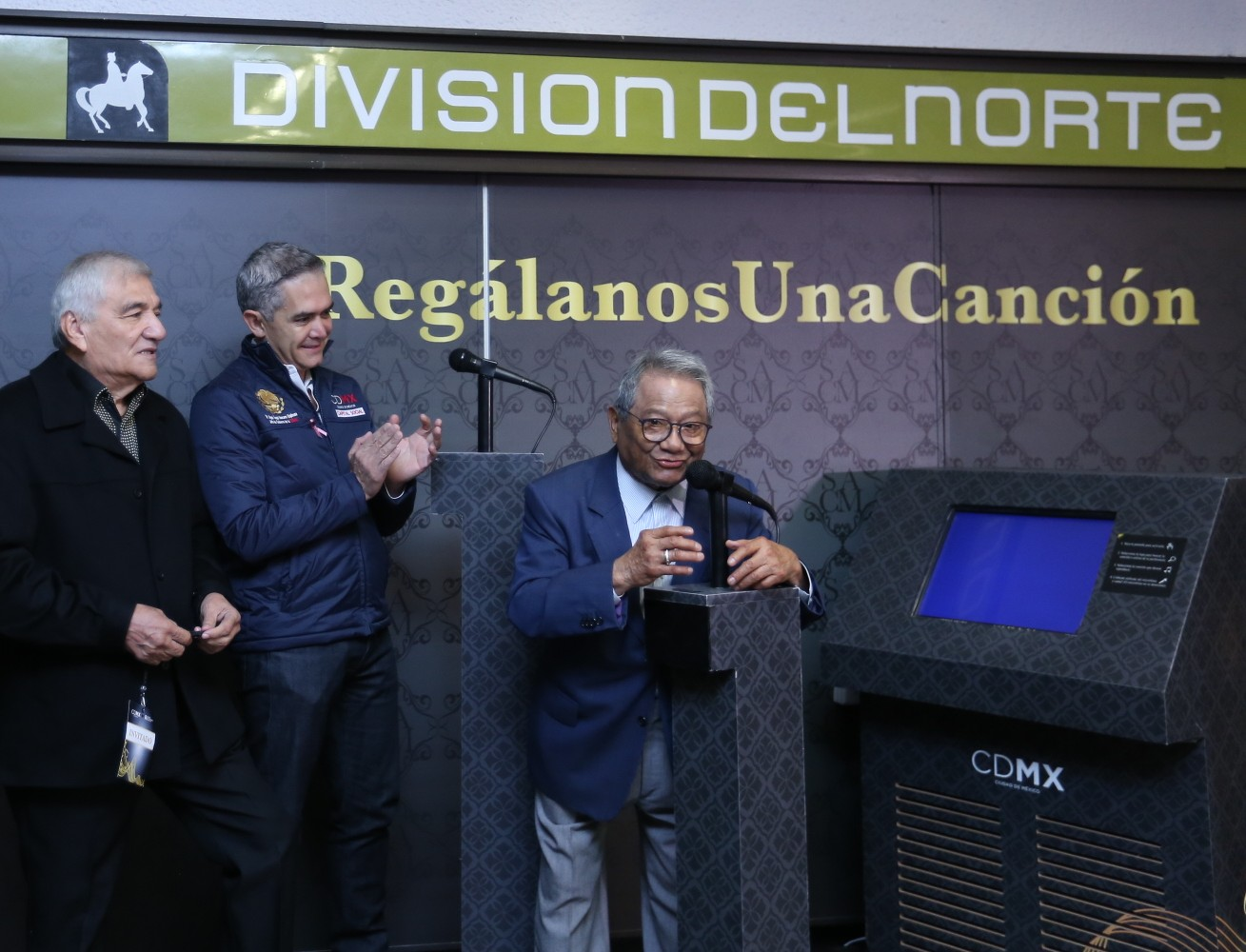
Armando Manzanero singing into the karaoke microphone

División del Norte metro station was selected as an emblematic stop. Its interior features photographs and information about Mexican composers and singers, including Ricardo López Méndez, Reyli, Antonio Aguilar, Juan Gabriel, Alexander Acha, Aleks Syntek, and Ana Gabriel.

The station has a karaoke machine that allows commuters to sing songs using its display. It was inaugurated on 14 October 2017 by the head of government of Mexico City Miguel Ángel Mancera, who added, "music is bringing us comfort [...] expressing our emotions in our own way". Armando Manzanero was present at the event. Also, the station has a piano, which allows metro passengers to play compositions.

Additionally, División del Norte station has a cultural display, containing memorabilia related to singers, and a mural by Graziella Scotese, titled Encuentro de culturas (transl. Encounter of the Cultures).

== History and construction ==
Line 3 of the Mexico City Metro was built by Ingeniería de Sistemas de Transportes Metropolitano, Electrometro, and Cometro, the latter being a subsidiary of Empresas ICA. The section including División del Norte station formed part of a southward extension from Centro Médico to Zapata, opened on 25 August 1980, with service running north to Indios Verdes and south to Zapata. The section between División del Norte and Eugenia station measures 715 meters (2,346 ft), while the opposite tunnel toward Zapata station is 794 meters (2,605 ft) long.

The station formerly connected to Line O of the trolleybus system, which ran from San Antonio metro station to the Central de Abastos wholesale market.

=== Name and pictogram ===
The station's pictogram features the silhouette of the equestrian statue of Pancho Villa found in nearby Parque de los Venados. The stop is named after the División del Norte armed faction, formed during the Mexican Revolution and led by Francisco "Pancho" Villa. The statue formerly stood at the intersection where the station was later constructed, before being relocated.

=== Incidents ===
Judith Velasco, Cuban actress and vedette, killed herself at the station. She gained popularity in Mexico during the 1970s and 1980s through appearances in productions such as El ministro y yo, Bellas de noche, La Carabina de Ambrosio, and Madres egoístas. According to acquaintances, she had experienced depression, faced declining work opportunities after being rejected by producers, and felt isolated in the days before her death. On the morning of 16 February 1994, Velasco left her home in Colonia del Valle, entered the station, and died by suicide after being struck by a train. Her remains were identified through her membership card from the National Association of Actors. As she had no family in the country, colleagues arranged her burial.

== Ridership ==
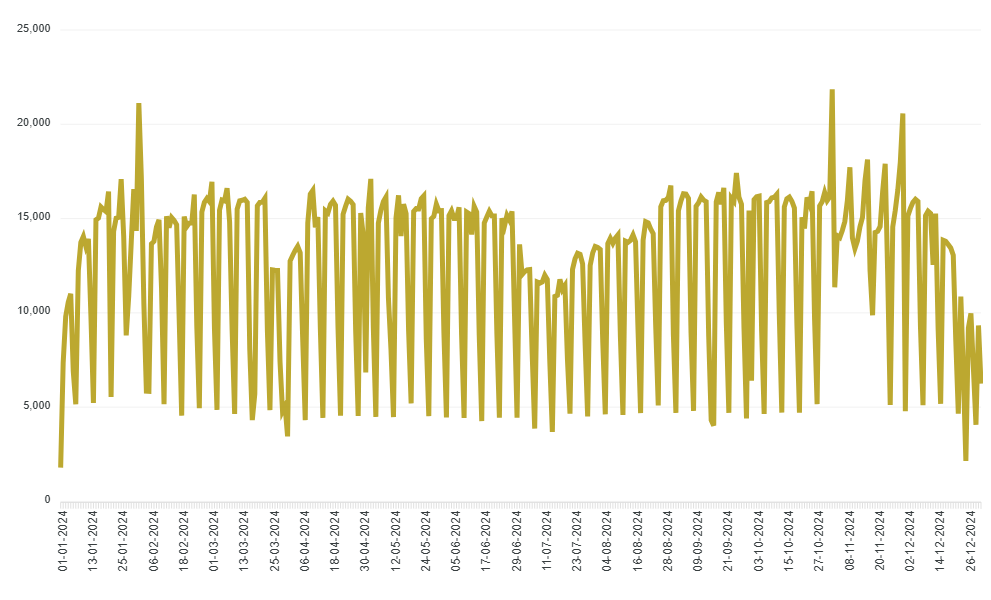
Daily ridership for División del Norte station in 2024

According to official data, before the impact of the COVID-19 pandemic, the station recorded between 17,900 and 19,500 average daily entries from 2016 to 2019. In 2025, it recorded 4,557,795 passenger entries, ranking 115th among the system's 195 stations.

Annual passenger ridership
Year	Ridership	Average daily	Rank	% change	Ref.
2025	4,557,795	12,487	115/195	+1.87%	
2024	4,474,022	12,224	110/195	−1.49%	
2023	4,541,805	12,433	104/195	+8.76%	
2022	4,176,143	11,441	103/195	+48.32%	
2021	2,815,721	7,714	116/195	−19.55%	
2020	3,499,805	9,562	106/195	−46.58%	
2019	6,552,063	17,950	100/195	−3.24%	
2018	6,771,499	18,552	94/195	+0.96%	
2017	6,706,794	18,374	95/195	−5.62%	
2016	7,106,344	19,416	89/195	−0.02%	

== Gallery ==
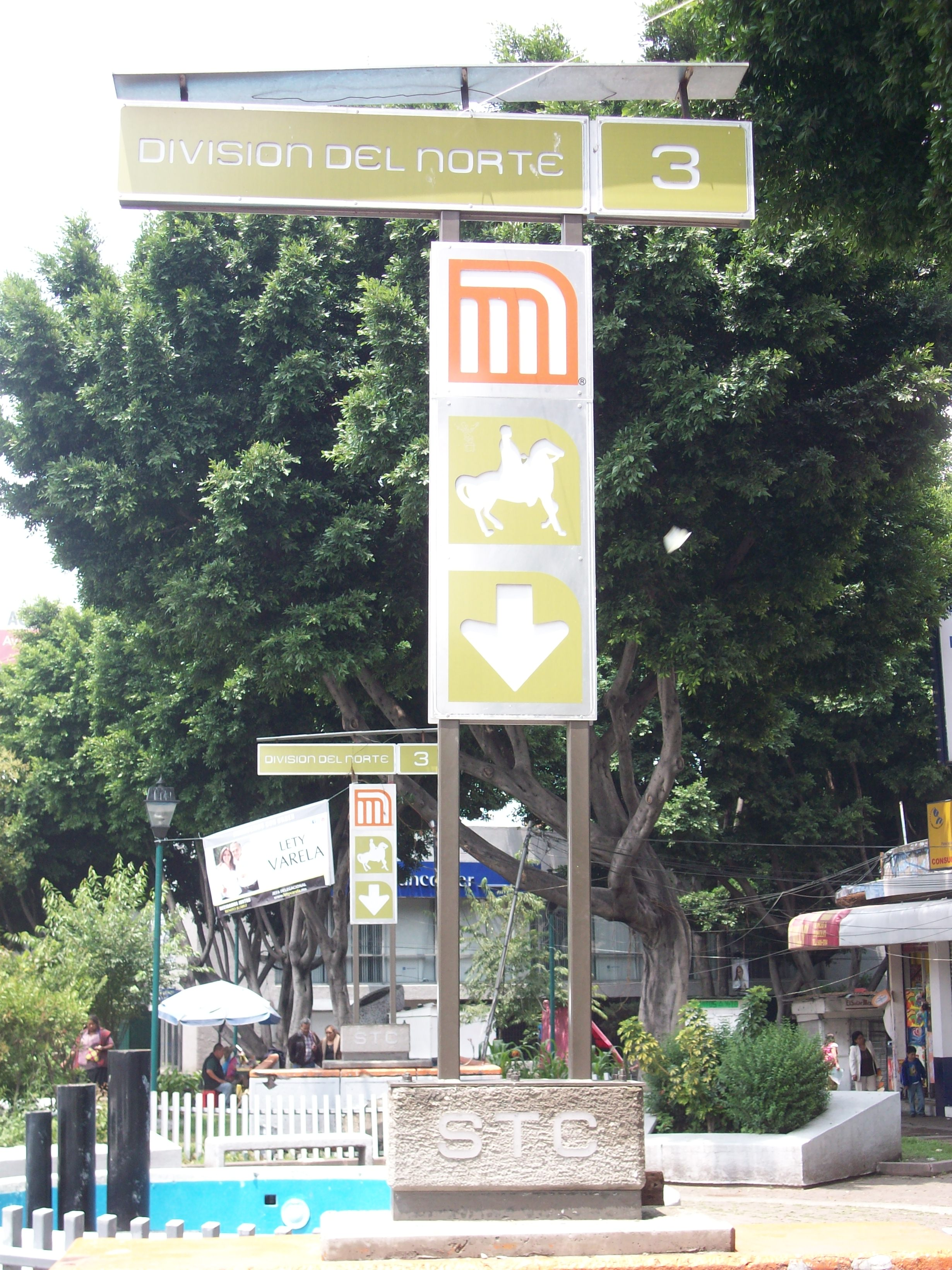
División del Norte metro station is located at the intersection of Avenida Universidad (pictured), Avenida División del Norte, and Avenida Cuauhtémoc

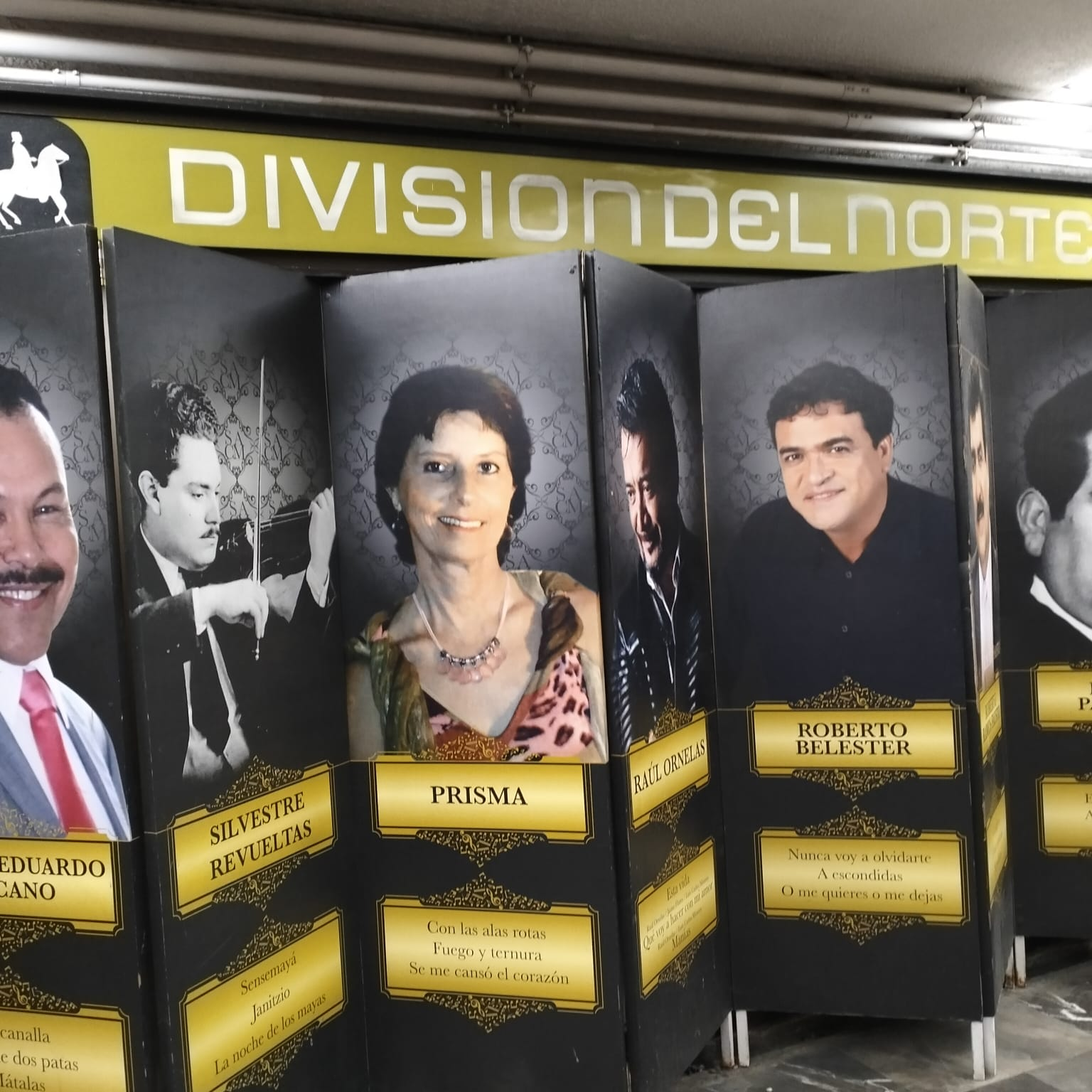
Station hall displaying biographies of composers.

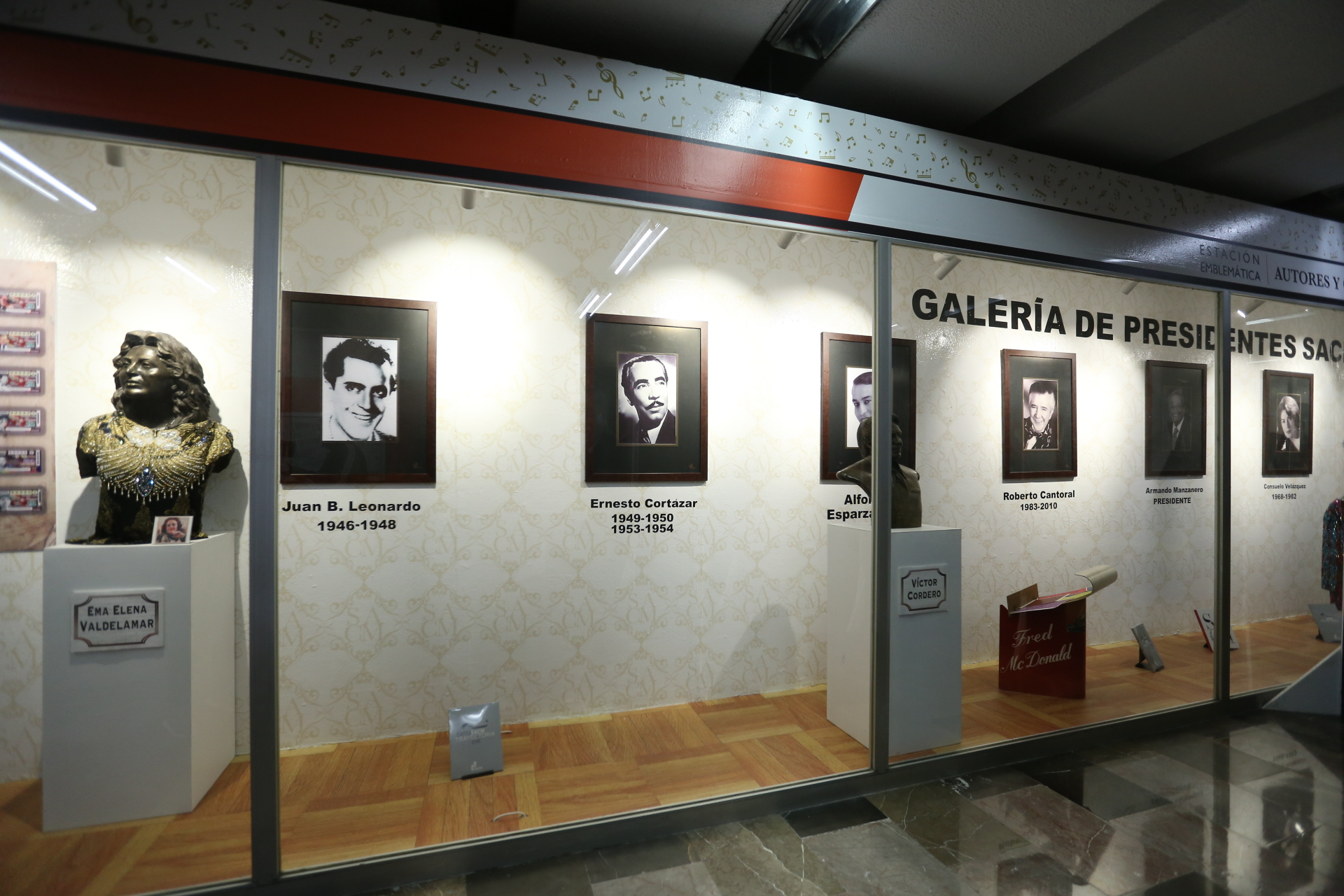
The cultural display at the station

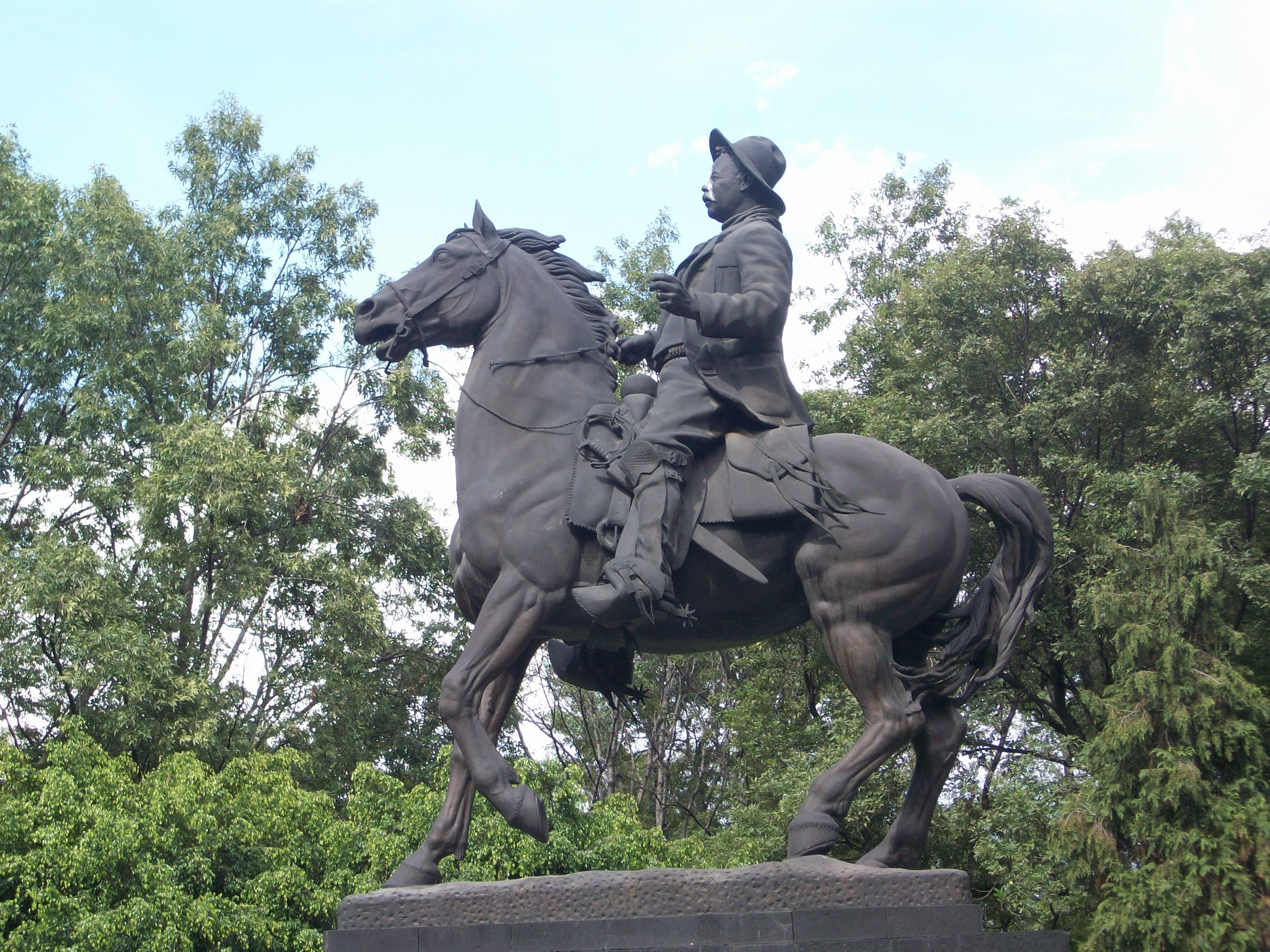
The Equestrian statue of Pancho Villa in Parque de los Venados was the inspiration for the station's pictogram.

== See also ==
- Polanco metro station, a Mexico City Metro station featuring an interactive staircase piano
