= Colonia San Simón Tolnáhuac =

Human settlement in Mexico

Coordinates: 19°27′32.49″N 99°8′34.9″W

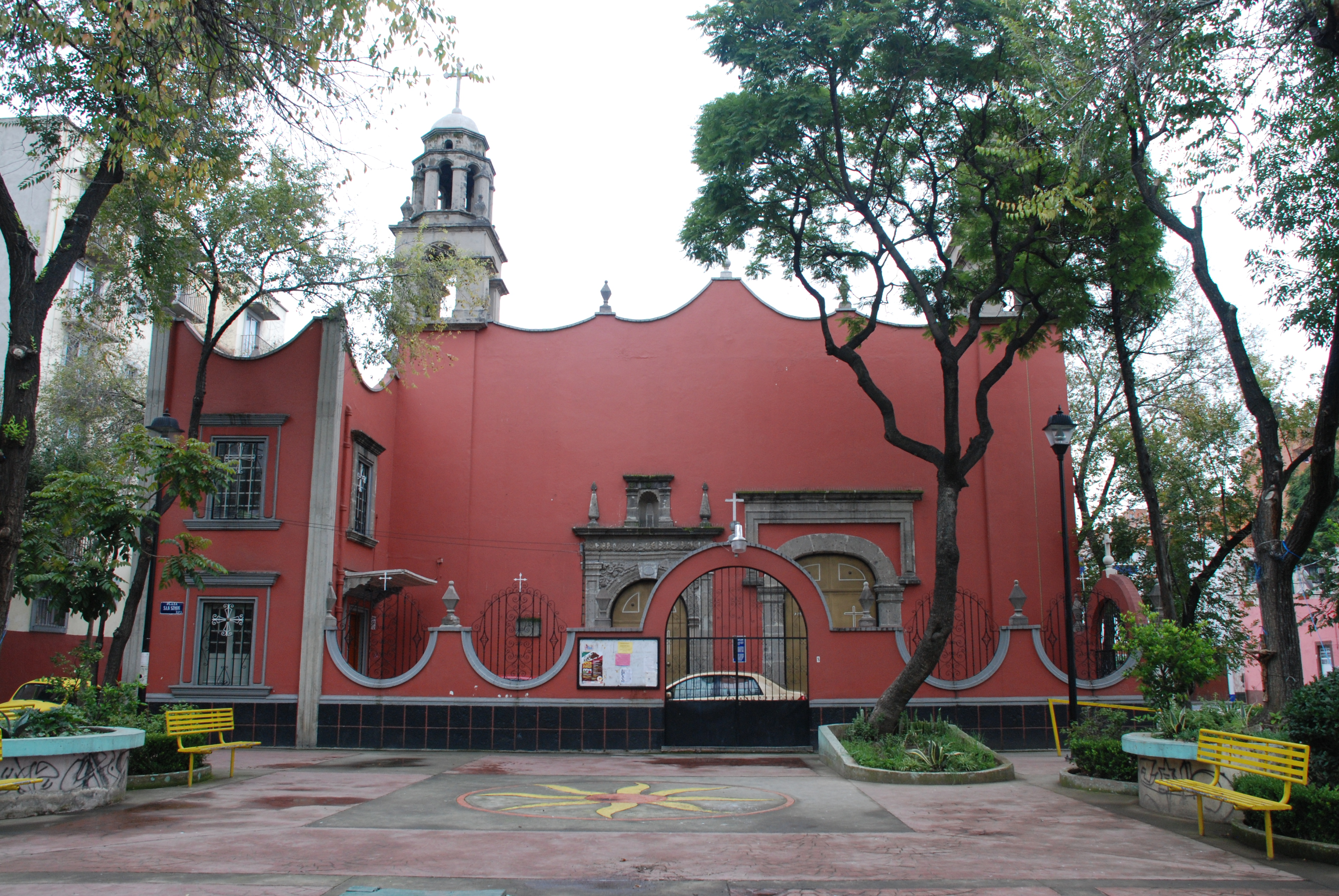
Plaza San Simón Tolnáhuac

Colonia San Simón Tolnáhuac is a colonia in the Cuauhtémoc borough of Mexico City, just north of the city's historic center. The colonia's borders are marked by the following streets: Eje 1 Poniente to the south, Avenida Rio Consulado to the north, Lerdo Street and Calzada Vallejo to the east and Avenida de los Insurgentes Norte to the west.

This area originally was part of the Tlatelolco dominion and functioned as communal farmland through most of the pre-Hispanic and colonial periods. Its center was the village of San Simon Tolnáhuac. Tolnáhuac comes from Nahuatl and means “in reeds.” Around 1873, some of the farmland around here began to be subdivided and this subdivision called Cuitlahuac Ferrocarrilera. This subdivision was mostly populated by railroad workers who worked at the nearby Nonoalco station. This station was located at what is now the corner of Manuel González and Lerdo Street and belonged to the Monte Alto rail company. The main tracks were where San Simon Atlampa Street is now and at that time, divided the zone in half. By 1928, it was still the last independent village just north of the Mexico City's historic center, when it was finally incorporated.

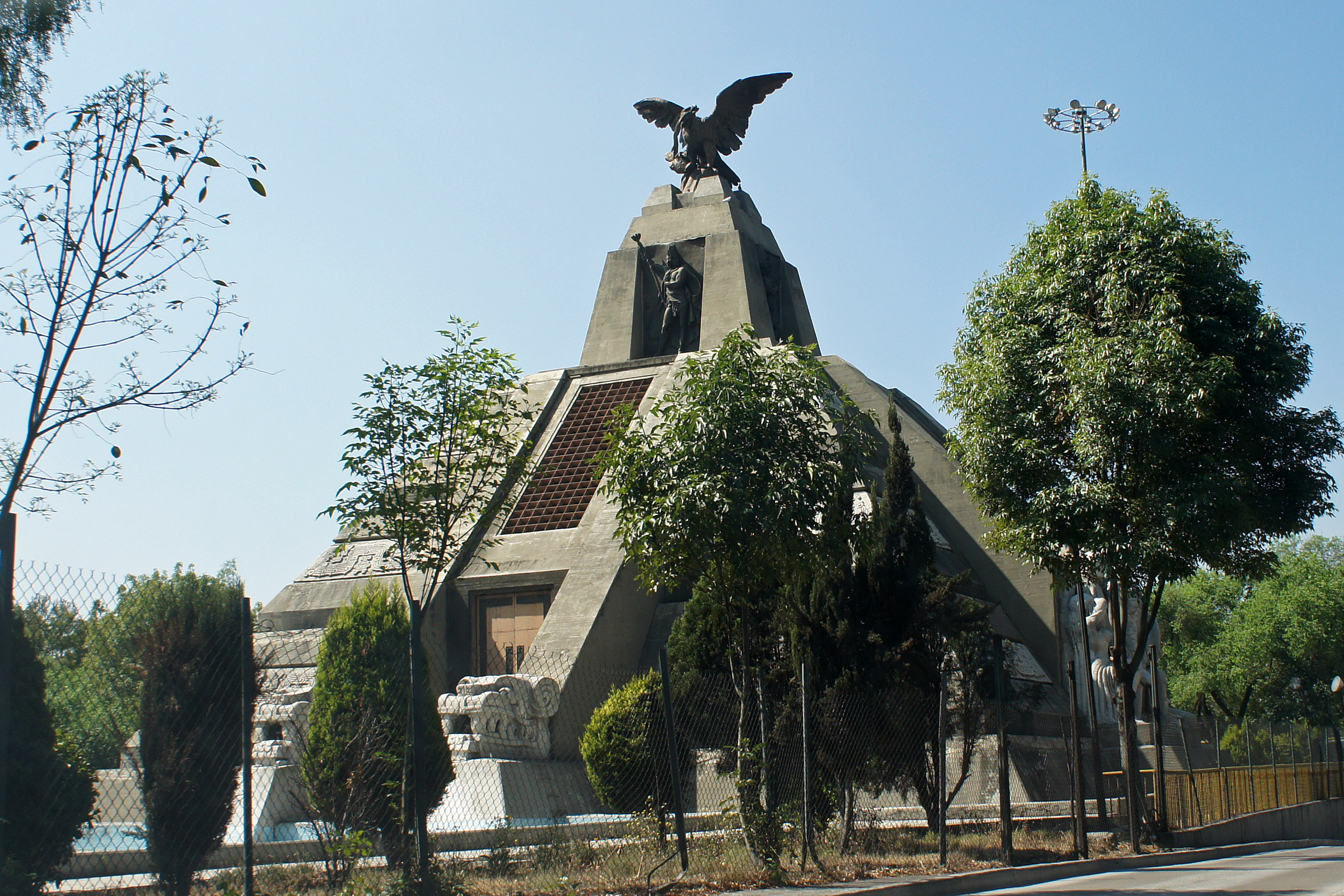
Monumento a la Raza

In 2008, the borough sponsored the twelfth “Rescue of the Urban Image of the Habitational Units in San Simón Tolnáhuac. The goal of the program is to maintain and repair aspects of large apartment units such as repairs of walls, courtyards, facades, railings and fences as well as maintenance work on lighting and sewer and other projects. That year, the focus was on several units on Jupiter Street. This program is a spinoff of the Rescue of the Urban Image of Green and Recreation Areas. In 2009, the borough announced the construction of a cultural center for the colonia.

Schools in the colonia include the Centro de Integracion Infantil Carrusel preschool (private), Francisco Diaz Covarrubias primary school (public), Kinder las Rositas preschool (private), Mi Arco Iris preschool (private), Professor Luis de la Brina primary school (public) and the Tres Culturas primary school (private).

This area is known for its syncretic religious practices, which combine mystical Christianity with Kardecian spiritualism. Practitioners believe that mediums can offer healing for physical, psychological, and spiritual ailments.

In this area there are 2 of the largest temples of Marian Trinitarian spiritualism: The temple of midday and the temple of faith, located less than 500 meters from each other. The temples operate as non-commercial religious centers and are described by practitioners as offering charitable services to the community.
