= Zapata metro station =

Mexico City metro station

Zapata
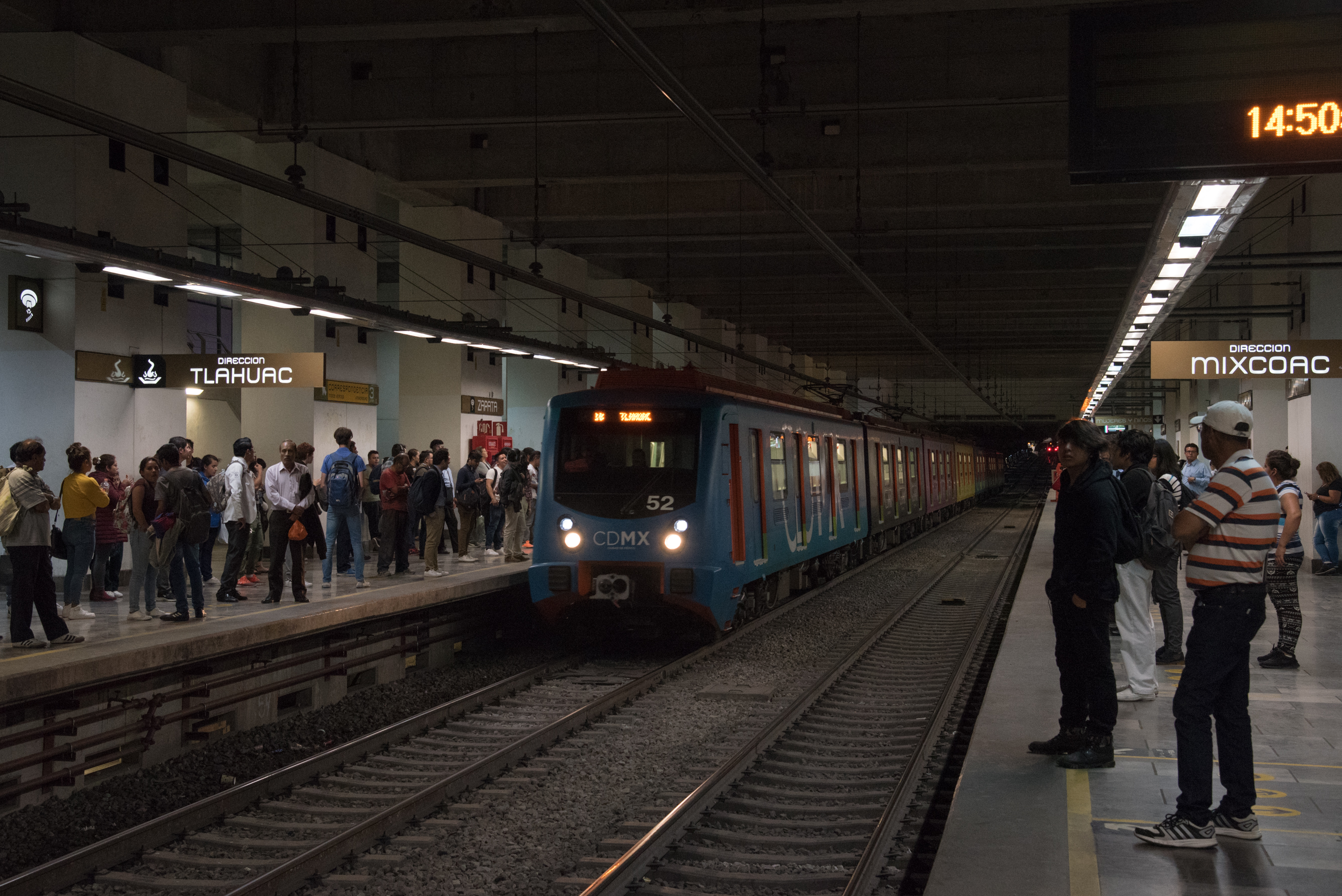
- A train arriving at Line 12 platforms, October 2018

General information
- Location: Santa Cruz Atoyac, Benito Juárez; Mexico City; Mexico
- Coordinates: 19.370952°N 99.164937°W
- System: Mexico City Metro
- Operator: Sistema de Transporte Colectivo (STC)
- Platforms: 4 side platforms
- Tracks: 4
- Connections: Pueblo Santa Cruz Atoyac

Construction
- Structure type: Underground
- Parking: no
- Cycle facilities: yes
- Accessible: yes

Other information
- Status: In service

History
- Opened: 25 August 1980; 45 years ago 30 October 2012; 13 years ago

Key dates
- 3 May 2021; 5 years ago: Temporarily closed
- 15 January 2023; 3 years ago: Reopened

Passengers
- 2023: Total: 10,100,992; 5,618,774 (Note: The data here is limited to the most recent ten years to avoid excessive listings; earlier figures can be found in this page's history or on the Mexico City Metro website. To calculate the average daily ridership, the annual total is divided by 365 days (366 in leap years), with decimals omitted from the result. Each station per line is ranked individually, as the system counts transfer stations separately. The percentage change is calculated automatically using the data from the current year and the previous year.); 4,482,218 ▼1.71%
- Rank: 86/195; 118/195

Services
Preceding station	Mexico City Metro	Following station
División del Norte toward Indios Verdes	Line 3	Coyoacán toward Universidad
Hospital 20 de Noviembre toward Mixcoac	Line 12	Parque de los Venados toward Tláhuac
Route map
Location
- Location within Mexico City
- Area map

Zapata is a station on Line 3 and Line 12 of the Mexico City Metro, in the Benito Juárez borough of Mexico City. The station logo depicts Emiliano Zapata, a national hero from the Mexican Revolution of 1910–1921.

The station serves the Colonia Del Valle and Santa Cruz Atoyac neighborhoods in Benito Juárez. It is located at the intersection of Universidad, Zapata, Municipio Libre, Félix Cuevas and Heriberto Frías.

== Metro lines ==
The station serves both lines as a transfer station and as the northwestern terminus of Line 12. This station used to be the terminus of Line 3; while the line has since been extended south, it still plays an important role in the transportation of the city's inhabitants. The metro station was opened on 25 August 1980. The Line 12 station was opened on 30 October 2012 as a part of the first stretch of Line 12 between Mixcoac and Tláhuac.

== Bus services ==
Metro Zapata transfers to trolleybus Line "D", which runs between Metro Mixcoac (Line 7, Line 12) and the San Andrés Tetepilco neighbourhood.

Above the station is a microbus base, for a recently built large commercial district a few blocks away, with malls, grocery stores, price clubs, cinemas and restaurants.

== Nearby ==
- Newspaper Reforma headquarters.

== Exits ==
- East: Avenida Universidad and Eje 7 Sur Félix Cuevas, Santa Cruz Atoyac
- Northwest: Avenida Universidad, Santa Cruz Atoyac
- Southwest: Heriberto Frías street and Eje 7 Sur Félix Cuevas, Colonia del Valle

== Ridership ==
Annual passenger ridership (Line 3)
Year	Ridership	Average daily	Rank	% change	Ref.
2025	5,618,774	15,393	86/195	−6.16%
2024	5,987,397	16,359	75/195	−15.13%
2023	7,054,505	19,327	56/195	−34.98%
2022	10,850,515	29,727	20/195	+57.04%
2021	6,909,278	18,929	27/195	+45.42%
2020	4,751,341	12,981	65/195	−47.37%
2019	9,027,192	24,732	57/195	+2.47%
2018	8,809,512	24,135	60/195	−7.17%
2017	9,489,440	25,998	51/195	−4.51%
2016	9,937,292	27,151	50/195	−5.89%

Annual passenger ridership (Line 12)
Year	Ridership	Average daily	Rank	% change	Ref.
2025	4,482,218	12,280	118/195	+3.64%
2024	4,324,975	11,816	116/195	+34.24%
2023	3,221,757	8,826	127/195	NA
2022	0	0	176/195	−100.00%
2021	895,128	2,452	182/195	−64.83%
2020	2,545,005	6,953	135/195	−50.94%
2019	5,187,865	14,213	125/195	+0.82%
2018	5,145,693	14,097	125/195	+4.87%
2017	4,906,836	13,443	125/195	+9.81%
2016	4,468,452	12,208	135/195	+15.19%

== Gallery ==
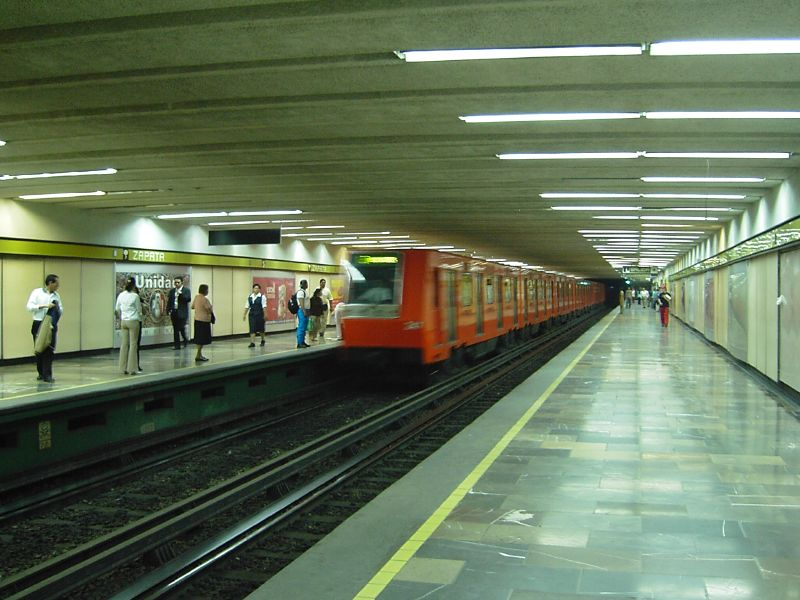
A Line 3 train pulls into the station, 6 June 2005.

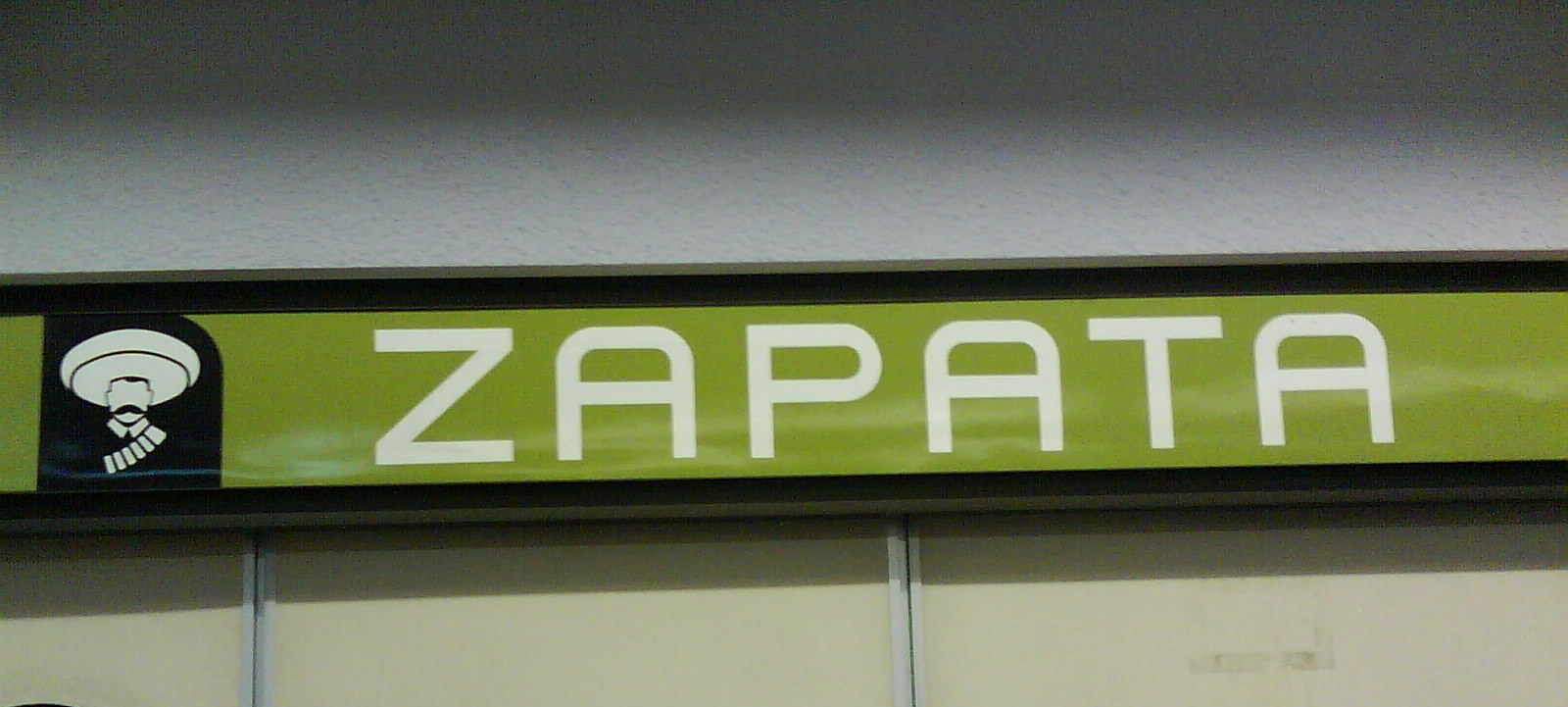
The station logo, depicting an eyeless, stylised Zapata.

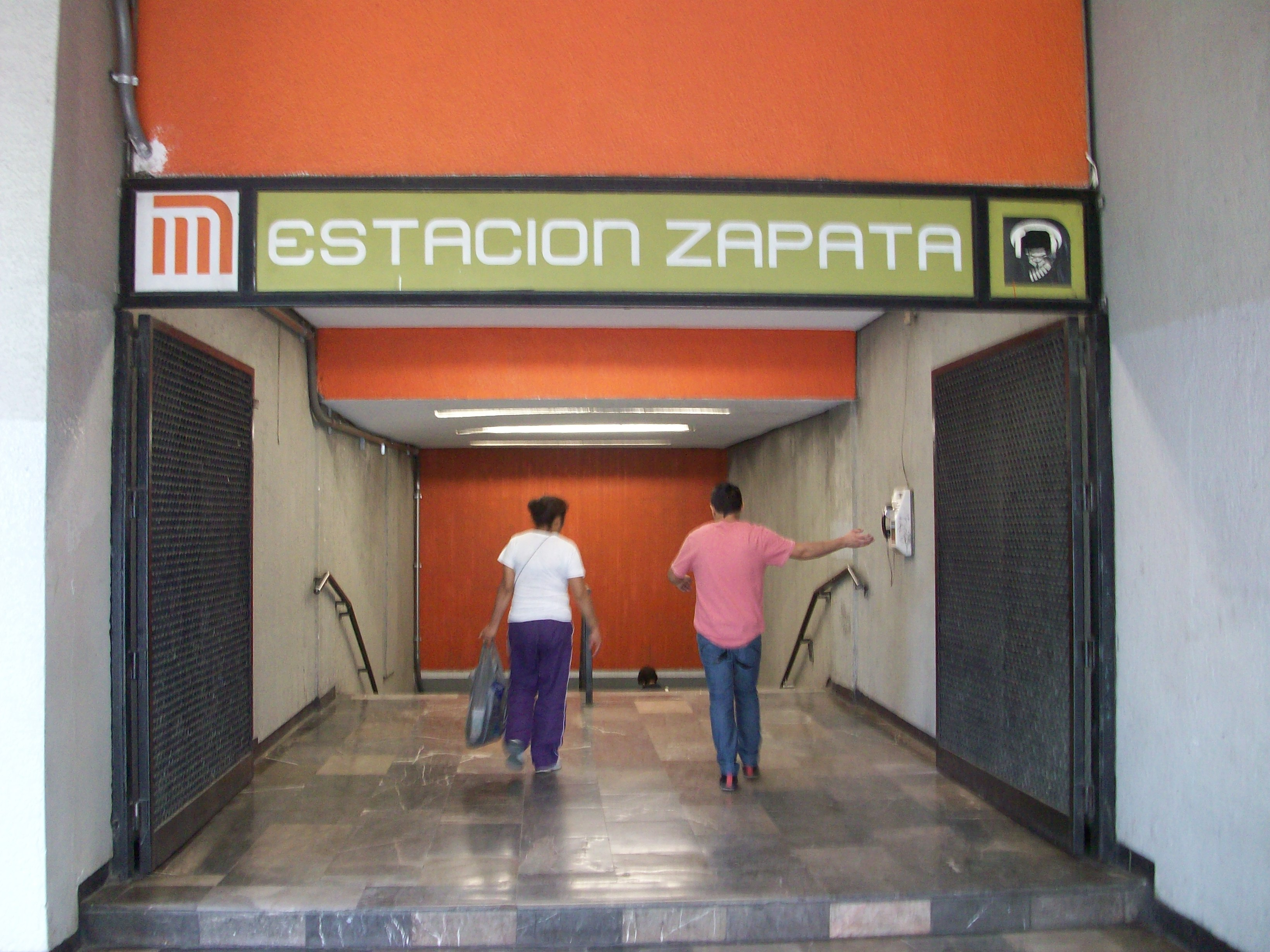
One of the station entrances.
