= Colonia Santa María Insurgentes =

Human settlement in Mexico

Coordinates: 19°27′38.9″N 99°8′59.31″W

Colonia Santa María Insurgentes is a colonia in the Cuauhtémoc borough north east of the Mexico City's historic center. The colonia's borders are formed by the following roads: Calzada de San Simon to the south, Jacarandas to the north, Avenida de los Insurgentes Norte to the east and Jacarandas to the west.

The official establishment of the colonia occurred in 1910, but there had been named streets and laid out blocks for some time before this. The land here belonged to the El Chopo Ranch before much of it was sold and eventually subdivided. The government order establishing the colonia mandates the conservation of the layout and street names. However, the colonia did not receive its name until 1950, when it was expanded. The area was originally conceived to be residential, but much of it became industrial. Today, much of the area is still industrial, with major facilities such as those belonging to Unilever on Rio Consulado.

Area schools include Cecyt Num. 12, Jose Maria Morelos y Pavon technical school (public), Colegio Bilingue Madison primary (private), and Escuela Secundaria y Preparatoria Justo Sierra, Plantel Azahares (middle and high school) (private) .

The Tren Suburbano commuter line crosses through the colonia as it connects downtown Mexico City with suburbs to the north of the city. Neighbors both in this colonia and neighboring Colonia Atlampa have complained that the train, built in the 2000s, has brought more crime to an area that already has serious problems of this type. They also claim that the rail line causes traffic jams, especially as the trains go over the speed limit and disregard traffic signals on streets such as Geranio, San Simon, Mimosas and Cipres.

Even without the suburban train, traffic is problematic in the colonia. One bad intersection, reported by El Universal newspaper, is Eje 2 Norte and Geranio, where micros (small privately owned buses) routinely ignore traffic signals and police are either non-existent. On a number of other roads, driver frequently take shortcuts over roads going against traffic. Streets such as Oyamel, Abedules and Mimosas have many potholes.

The colonia has long had crime problems especially from youths as they leave school for the day. Crimes include vandalism, drug use and sales and the stealing of cars. Residents claim that they have appealed to city and federal authorities for help but with no response. The colonia is home to one major tianguis, or open flea market, which is a cultural heritage from the pre-Hispanic era. It is called El Nopal. While it sells food, clothing and other everyday items, it has also been accused of trafficking in arms and other contraband.

The Glorieta de la Raza is located on the extreme northeast of the colonia, and is a large 5-lane traffic circle with the Monumento a la Raza (Monument to the Race) in the center. It is an extremely busy intersection connecting Insurgentes Norte, Vallejo and Circuito Interior arteries. It was originally designed for cars and light trucks but many tractor trailers also use the intersection as well. This and speeding has caused frequent accidents on this circle.
