= Mexico City Metrobús Line 2 =

Bus rapid transit line

Metrobús Line 2
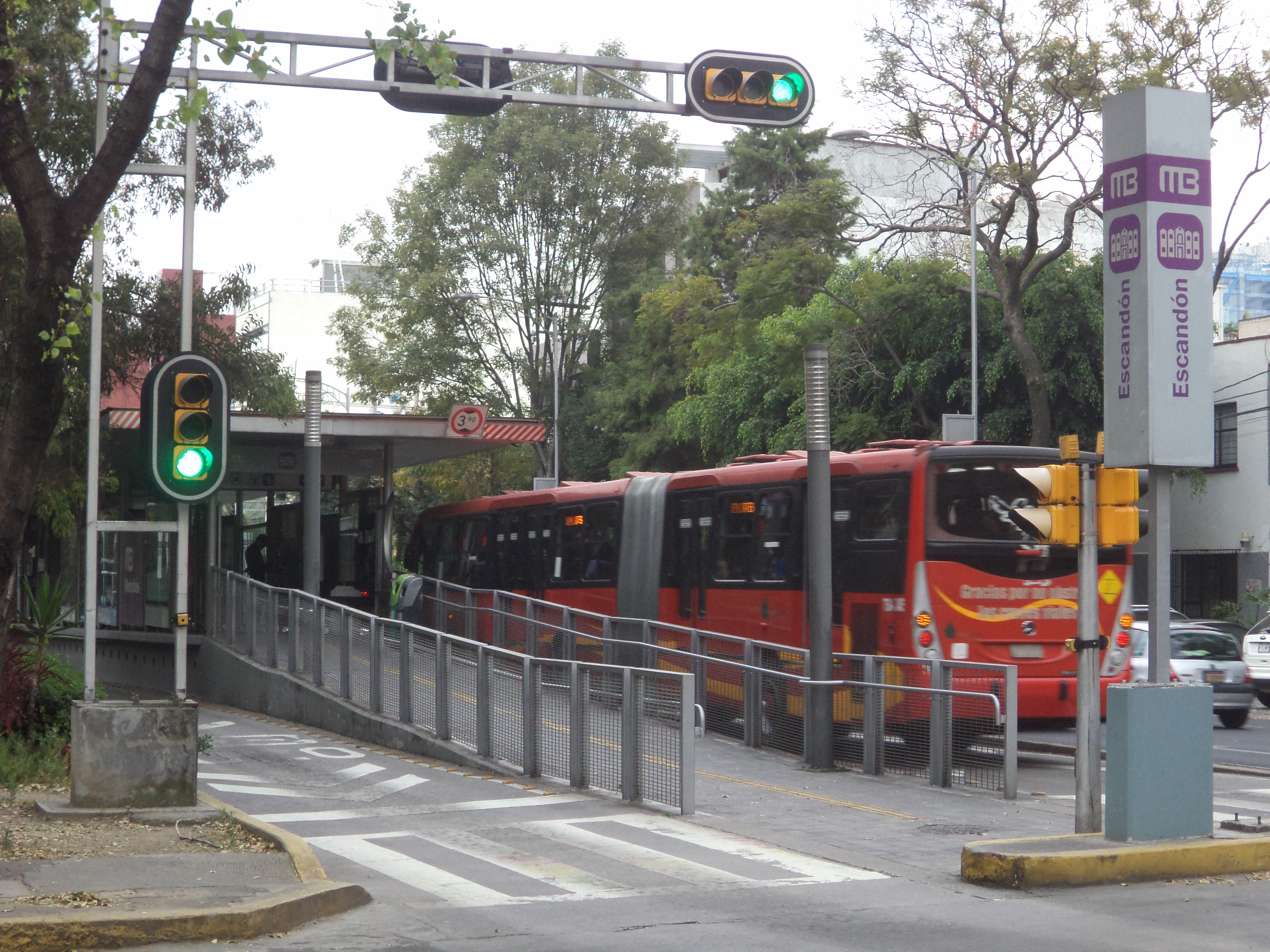
- Bus at the Escandón station

Overview
- Status: In service
- Termini: Tepalcates / Del Moral / Río Frío; Tacubaya / Etiopía / Dr. Gálvez / Juárez
- Stations: 37
- Website: Línea 2

Service
- Type: Bus rapid transit
- System: Mexico City Metrobus
- Services: 4
- Operator: See Operators

History
- Opened: December 16, 2008; 17 years ago

Technical
- Line length: 20 km (12.4 mi)
- Character: Exclusive right-of-way

The Mexico City Metrobús Line 2 is a bus rapid transit line in the Mexico City Metrobus. It operates between Tepalcates, in Iztapalapa and Tacubaya in the Miguel Hidalgo municipality, in western Mexico City.

Line 2 has a total of 36 stations and a length of 20 kilometers and it runs from east to west through Eje 4 Sur.

Construction of Line 2 started on September 4, 2007 and it was inaugurated on December 16, 2008 by Marcelo Ebrard, Head of Government of the Federal District from 2006 to 2012.

== Service description ==
=== Services ===
The line has six itineraries.

Tepalcates to Tacubaya

To Tacubaya
- First Bus: 4:30 (Monday-Friday)
- Last Bus: 23:57 (Monday-Friday)
- First Bus: 4:30 (Saturday)
- Last Bus: 00:00 (Saturday)
- First Bus: 5:00 (Sunday)
- Last Bus: 23:50 (Sunday)

To Tepalcates
- First Bus: 4:35 (Monday-Friday)
- Last Bus: 23:59 (Monday-Friday)
- First Bus: 4:35 (Saturday)
- Last Bus: 00:00 (Saturday)
- First Bus: 5:00 (Sunday)
- Last Bus: 00:02 (Sunday)

Tepalcates to Etiopía

To Etiopía
- First Bus: 5:00 (Monday-Friday)
- Last Bus: 21:59 (Monday-Friday)
- First Bus: 5:30 (Saturday)
- Last Bus: 21:11 (Saturday)
No service on Sunday

To Tepalcates
- First Bus: 5:25 (Monday-Friday)
- Last Bus: 22:25 (Monday-Friday)
- First Bus: 7:12 (Saturday)
- Last Bus: 20:00 (Saturday)
No service on Sunday

Tepalcates to Colonia del Valle (Line 1)

To Colonia del Valle
- First Bus: 4:36 (Monday-Friday)
- Last Bus: 23:00 (Monday-Friday)
- First Bus: 4:37 (Saturday)
- Last Bus: 23:01 (Saturday)
- First Bus: 5:06 (Sunday)
- Last Bus: 23:01 (Sunday)

To Tepalcates
- First Bus: 4:45 (Monday-Friday)
- Last Bus: 23:00 (Monday-Friday)
- First Bus: 4:45 (Saturday)
- Last Bus: 23:22 (Saturday)
- First Bus: 5:15 (Sunday)
- Last Bus: 23:02 (Sunday)

Tepalcates to Nápoles (Line 1)

To Nápoles
- First Bus: 4:47 (daily)
- Last Bus: 21:13 (daily)

To Tepalcates
- First Bus: 5:31 (daily)
- Last Bus: 23:19 (daily)

Rojo Gómez to Doctor Gálvez (Line 1)

To Doctor Gálvez
- First Bus: 5:30 (Monday–Friday)
- Last Bus: 20:56 (Monday–Friday)
No service on Saturday and Sunday

To Rojo Gómez
- First Bus: 5:41 (Monday–Friday)
- Last Bus: 21:27 (Monday–Friday)
No service on Saturday and Sunday

Río Frío to Colonia del Valle (Line 1)

To Colonia del Valle
- First Bus: 5:30 (Monday–Friday)
- Last Bus: 10:28 (Monday–Friday)
No service on Saturday and Sunday

To Río Frío
- First Bus: 6:26 (Monday–Friday)
- Last Bus: 11:25 (Monday–Friday)
No service on Saturday and Sunday

Line 2 services the Iztapalapa, Iztacalco, Benito Juárez, Cuauhtémoc, and Miguel Hidalgo and Álvaro Obregón boroughs.

=== Station list ===
Key (Note: The following list was adapted from different websites and official maps.: Metro connections obtained from the official Mexico City Metro system map.; Accessibility obtained from the Mexico City Metro system map. In some cases, the map omits the accessibility icon as the station(s) are actually partially accessible. However, the respective websites of each station on the official site indicate the respective accessibility methods. Stations with the symbol are fully accessible; stations with the symbol are partially accessible.; Cablebús obtained from their official website.; Centro de transferencia modal (CETRAM;) obtained from the official website of the Órgano Regulador de Transporte.; Ecobici obtained from their official website.; Metrobús obtained from the Mexico City Metrobús system map.; Mexibús obtained from the official Mexico City Metro system map.; Mexicable obtained from the official Mexico City Metro system map.; Public buses network (peseros) obtained from the official website of the Órgano Regulador de Transporte.; Red de Transporte de Pasajeros obtained from their official website.; Trolleybuses obtained from their official website.)
| Handicapped/disabled access | Fully accessible station | Cablebús Line {{{3}}} | Cablebús connection | Red de Transporte de Pasajeros | RTP connection |
| Handicapped/disabled access | Partially accessible station | Mexibús | Mexibús connection | Tren Interurbano | Tren Interurbano connection |
| Transfer hub | CETRAM transfer station | Mexicable | Mexicable connection | Tren Suburbano | Tren Suburbano connection |
| Transfer hub | ETRAM transfer station | Mexico City Metro | Mexico City Metro connection | Trolleybus | Trolleybus connection |
| Ecobici | Ecobici bikeshare | Mexico City minubus | Pesero connection | Xochimilco Light Rail | Xochimilco Light Rail connection |

==== Tepalcates–Tacubaya ====
| Stations (Note: All the stations are fully accessible to people with disabilities.) | Connections | Neighborhood(s) | Borough | Picture | Date opened |
|---|---|---|---|---|---|
| Tepalcates | 162B, 163, 163A, 163B, 164, 166, 167; 9D, 9E | Unidad Habitacional Ejército Constitucionalista, Tepalcates | Iztapalapa | | December 16, 2008 |
| Nicolás Bravo (Note: Accessible from Tacubaya to Tepalcates.) | 162B, 163, 163A, 163B, 164, 166, 167 | Tepalcates | Iztapalapa | | December 16, 2008 |
| Canal de San Juan | 47A, 162B, 163, 163A, 163B, 164, 166, 167; 4B, 4C, 9B, 9E, 14A | Tepalcates | Iztapalapa | | December 16, 2008 |
| General Antonio de León (Note: Accessible from Tepalcates to Tacubaya.) | | Tepalcates | Iztapalapa | | December 16, 2008 |
| Constitución de Apatzingán | 4C, 9A | Tepalcates | Iztapalapa | | December 16, 2008 |
| CCH Oriente (Note: Formerly named "Tezontle".) | 4C | Unidad Habitacional Ejército Constitucionalista | Iztapalapa | | December 16, 2008 |
| Leyes de Reforma | | Colonia Leyes de Reforma 3^{a} Sección | Iztapalapa | | December 16, 2008 |
| Del Moral | | Colonia Cuchilla del Moral, Colonia Leyes de Reforma 3^{a} Sección | Iztapalapa | | December 16, 2008 |
| Río Frío | | Colonia Cuchilla del Moral | Iztapalapa | | December 16, 2008 |
| Rojo Gómez | | Colonia Dr. Alfonso Díaz Tirado | Iztapalapa | | December 16, 2008 |
| Río Mayo | | Colonia Dr. Alfonso Díaz Tirado | Iztapalapa | | December 16, 2008 |
| Río Tecolutla | | Colonia Real del Moral | Iztapalapa | | December 16, 2008 |
| El Rodeo | 14A | Colonia Paseos de Churubusco, Colonia El Rodeo | Iztapalapa | | December 16, 2008 |
| UPIICSA | | Colonia Granjas México, Colonia Ampliación Gabriel Ramos Millán | Iztacalco | | December 16, 2008 |
| Iztacalco | 14A | Colonia Granjas México, Colonia Ampliación Gabriel Ramos Millán | Iztacalco | | December 16, 2008 |
| Goma | 43, 200; 14A | Colonia Granjas México, Colonia Gabriel Ramos Millán | Iztacalco | | December 16, 2008 |
| Tlacotal | | Colonia Granjas México, Colonia Gabriel Ramos Millán | Iztacalco | | December 16, 2008 |
| Canela | | Colonia Granjas México, Colonia Gabriel Ramos Millán | Iztacalco | | December 16, 2008 |
| Metro Coyuya | 14A | Coyuya, Granjas México, Barrio de los Reyes, Tlazintla | Iztacalco | | September 7, 2020 |
| Coyuya | | Santa Anita, Barrio Los Reyes | Iztacalco | | December 16, 2008 |
| La Viga | 37 | Nueva Santa Anita, Barrio San Francisco Xicaltongo | Iztacalco | | December 16, 2008 |
| Andrés Molina | | Nueva Santa Anita, Barrio San Pedro | Iztacalco | | December 16, 2008 |
| Las Américas | | Colonia Moderna | Benito Juárez | | December 16, 2008 |
| Xola | 2A, 31B, 111A, 145A; 17C, 17H, 17I | Colonia Álamos | Benito Juárez | | December 16, 2008 |
| Álamos | | Colonia Álamos | Benito Juárez | | December 16, 2008 |
| Centro SCOP | Trolleybus Trolleybus Line 1 | Narvarte Oriente | Benito Juárez | | December 16, 2008 |
| Doctor Vértiz | | Narvarte Oriente | Benito Juárez | | December 16, 2008 |
| Etiopía/Plaza de la Transparencia | Mexico City Metro Line 3 Mexico City Metrobús Mexico City Metrobús Line 1 Mexico City Metrobús Line 3 Ecobici | Narvarte Poniente | Benito Juárez | | December 16, 2008 |
| Amores | Mexico City Metrobús Mexico City Metrobús Line 1 | Colonia del Valle Norte | Benito Juárez | | December 16, 2008 |
| Viaducto | Mexico City Metrobús Mexico City Metrobús Line 1 | Colonia Roma Sur | Cuauhtémoc | | December 16, 2008 |
| Nuevo León | Mexico City Metrobús Mexico City Metrobús Line 1 Ecobici | Hipódromo | Cuauhtémoc | | December 16, 2008 |
| Escandón | | Hipódromo, Escandón | Cuauhtémoc, Miguel Hidalgo | | December 16, 2008 |
| Patriotismo | 13A, 115A, 200; 9C, 9E, 21A | Hipódromo, Escandón | Cuauhtémoc, Miguel Hidalgo | | December 16, 2008 |
| De La Salle | 13A, 115A, 200 | Hipódromo Condesa, Escandón | Cuauhtémoc, Miguel Hidalgo | | December 16, 2008 |
| Parque Lira | | San Miguel Chapultepec | Miguel Hidalgo | | December 16, 2008 |
| Antonio Maceo | | Tacubaya | Miguel Hidalgo | | December 16, 2008 |
| Tacubaya | (at Alameda Tacubaya); 110, 110B, 110C, 112, 113B, 115, 118, 119, 200; 1B, 9C, 9E, 21A; (at distance) | Tacubaya | Miguel Hidalgo | | December 16, 2008 |

==== Tepalcates–Doctor Gálvez branch ====
The route runs from Tepalcates to Viaducto normally. As soon as it reaches Avenida de los Insurgentes, the route detours towards Southern Mexico City sharing the same stations Line 1 uses. The branch originally ran from Tepalcates to Colonia del Valle stations, but since 31 October 2022, there is an additional service that runs from Rojo Gómez station to Doctor Gálvez station.

| Stations | Connections | Neighborhood(s) | Borough | Picture | Date opened |
|---|---|---|---|---|---|
| Viaducto | Mexico City Metrobús Mexico City Metrobús Line 1 | Colonia Roma Sur | Cuauhtémoc | | December 16, 2008 |
| Nuevo León (L1) | Mexico City Metrobús Mexico City Metrobús Line 1 | Hipódromo, Roma Sur | Cuauhtémoc | | June 19, 2005 |
| La Piedad | Mexico City Metrobús Mexico City Metrobús Line 1 | Nápoles, Del Valle Norte | Benito Juárez | | June 19, 2005 |
| Poliforum | Mexico City Metrobús Mexico City Metrobús Line 1 | Nápoles, Del Valle Norte | Benito Juárez | | June 19, 2005 |
| Nápoles | Mexico City Metrobús Mexico City Metrobús Line 1 | Nápoles, Del Valle Centro | Benito Juárez | | June 19, 2005 |
| Colonia del Valle | Mexico City Metrobús Mexico City Metrobús Line 1 | Nápoles, Insurgentes San Borja | Benito Juárez | | June 19, 2005 |
| Ciudad de los Deportes | Mexico City Metrobús Mexico City Metrobús Line 1 Ecobici | Ciudad de los Deportes, Insurgentes San Borja | Benito Juárez | | June 19, 2005 |
| Parque Hundido | Mexico City Metrobús Mexico City Metrobús Line 1 Ecobici | Noche Buena, Tlacoquemécatl | Benito Juárez | | June 19, 2005 |
| Félix Cuevas | (at Insurgentes Sur); (at Insurgentes Sur); 6A (at distance) | Extremadura Insurgentes, Tlacoquemécatl | Benito Juárez | | June 19, 2005 |
| Río Churubusco | 1D, 120, 121A, 200; 22A | Insurgentes Mixcoac, Actipán | Benito Juárez | | June 19, 2005 |
| Teatro Insurgentes | Mexico City Metrobús Mexico City Metrobús Line 1 | San José Insurgentes, Crédito Constructor | Benito Juárez | | June 19, 2005 |
| José María Velasco | 6A | Guadalupe Inn, Florida | Álvaro Obregón | | June 19, 2005 |
| Francia | Mexico City Metrobús Mexico City Metrobús Line 1 | Guadalupe Inn, Florida | Álvaro Obregón | | June 19, 2005 |
| Olivo | Mexico City Metrobús Mexico City Metrobús Line 1 | Guadalupe Inn, Florida | Álvaro Obregón | | June 19, 2005 |
| Altavista | 116A | Guadalupe Inn, Florida | Álvaro Obregón | | June 19, 2005 |
| La Bombilla | 21D (at distance), 34B | San Ángel, Chimalistac | Álvaro Obregón | | June 19, 2005 |
| Dr. Gálvez | 13A, 21D (at distance), 34B, 125, 128 | Barrio Loreto, Chimalistac | Álvaro Obregón | | June 19, 2005 |

==== Río Frío/Del Moral–Juárez branch ====
The route starts at Río Frío station and runs normally to Doctor Vértiz. As it reaches Etiopía / Plaza de la Transparencia station, the route detours at Avenida Cuauhtémoc towards Northern Mexico City sharing the same stations Line 3 uses until Juárez station. Then the route returns following the same route and it ends at Del Moral station.

| Stations | Connections | Neighborhood(s) | Borough | Picture | Date opened |
|---|---|---|---|---|---|
| Etiopía/Plaza de la Transparencia | Mexico City Metro Line 3 Mexico City Metrobús Mexico City Metrobús Line 3 Ecobici | Narvarte Poniente | Benito Juárez | | February 8, 2011 |
| Obrero Mundial | Mexico City Metrobús Mexico City Metrobús Line 3 Ecobici | Piedad Narvarte | Benito Juárez | | February 8, 2011 |
| Centro Médico | 9A, 9C, 9E | Roma Sur, Doctores | Cuauhtémoc | | February 8, 2011 |
| Dr. Márquez | Mexico City Metrobús Mexico City Metrobús Line 3 Ecobici | Roma Sur, Doctores | Cuauhtémoc | | February 8, 2011 |
| Hospital General | 9A, 9C, 9E (at distance), 19F | Roma Norte, Doctores | Cuauhtémoc | | February 8, 2011 |
| Jardín Pushkin | Mexico City Metrobús Mexico City Metrobús Line 3 Ecobici | Roma Norte, Doctores | Cuauhtémoc | | February 8, 2011 |
| Cuauhtémoc | 34A; 19E, 19F, 19G, 19H | Roma Norte, Doctores | Cuauhtémoc | | February 8, 2011 |
| Balderas | 34A; 19E, 19F, 19G, 19H | Centro | Cuauhtémoc | | February 8, 2011 |
| Juárez | Mexico City Metro Line 3 Mexico City Metrobús Mexico City Metrobús Line 3 Mexico City Metrobús Line 4 Ecobici | Centro | Cuauhtémoc | | February 8, 2011 |

== Operators ==
Line 2 has five operators.

- Corredor Oriente - Poniente, SA de CV (COP)
- Corredor Eje 4 - 17 de Marzo, SA de CV (CE4-17MSA)
- Transportes Sánchez Armas José Juan, SA de CV (TSA)
- Corredor Tacubaya - Tepalcates, SA de CV (CTT)
- Red de Transporte de Pasajeros del Distrito Federal
