= Mexico City Metrobús Line 1 =

Bus rapid transit line in the Mexico City Metrobús

Metrobús Line 1
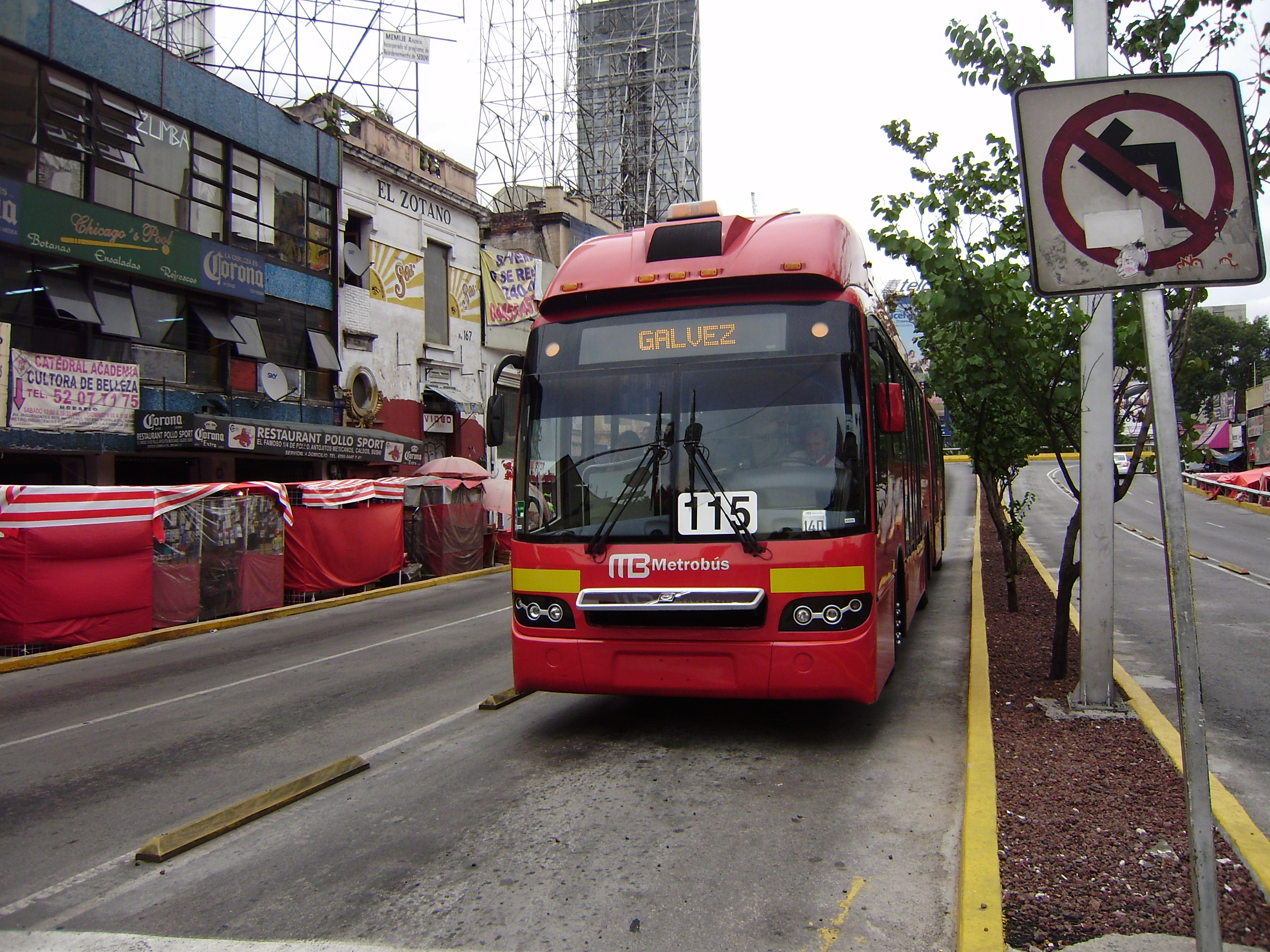
- Metrobús unit over Avenida de los Insurgentes

Overview
- Status: In service
- Termini: Indios Verdes / Buenavista; El Caminero / Dr. Gálvez / Insurgentes
- Stations: 46
- Website: Línea 1

Service
- Type: Bus rapid transit
- System: Mexico City Metrobus
- Services: 5
- Operator: See Operators
- Daily ridership: 600,000 (April 2018)

History
- Opened: 19 June 2005; 21 years ago

Technical
- Line length: 28.1 km (17.5 mi)
- Character: Exclusive right-of-way

The Mexico City Metrobús Line 1 is a bus rapid transit line in the Mexico City Metrobús. It operates between Indios Verdes, in the Gustavo A. Madero municipality in the northern part of the city, and El Caminero, in Tlalpan in southern Mexico City. The line was the first one to be built and opened. The first section of the line, known as Corredor Insurgentes, was inaugurated by Andrés Manuel López Obrador, Head of Government of the Federal District from 2000 to 2005, on 19 June 2005. The second stretch of the line, known as Corredor Insurgentes Sur, was inaugurated on 13 March 2008, by Marcelo Ebrard, Head of Government of the Federal District from 2006 to 2012.

The line has 46 stations and a total length of 28.1 kilometers.

== Service description ==
=== Services ===
The line has five itineraries.

Indios Verdes to Insurgentes

From Indios Verdes
- First Bus: 5:30 (Monday-Friday)
- Last Bus: 21:55 (Monday-Friday)
- First Bus: 8:00 (Saturday)
- Last Bus: 16:04 (Saturday)
No service on Sunday

To Indios Verdes
- First Bus: 5:58 (Monday-Friday)
- Last Bus: 22:23 (Monday-Friday)
- First Bus: 8:24 (Saturday)
- Last Bus: 16:27 (Saturday)
No service on Sunday

Indios Verdes to El Caminero

To El Caminero
- First Bus: 4:30 (Monday-Wednesday)
- Last Bus: 23:54 (Monday-Wednesday)
- First Bus: 4:30 (Thursday-Friday)
- Last Bus: 00:40 (Thursday-Friday)
- First Bus: 4:30 (Saturday)
- Last Bus: 00:40 (Saturday)
- First Bus: 5:00 (Sunday)
- Last Bus: 23:40 (Sunday)

To Indios Verdes
- First Bus: 4:30 (Monday-Wednesday)
- Last Bus: 23:35 (Monday-Wednesday)
- First Bus: 4:30 (Thursday-Friday)
- Last Bus: 00:40 (Thursday-Friday)
- First Bus: 4:30 (Saturday)
- Last Bus: 00:40 (Saturday)
- First Bus: 5:00 (Sunday)
- Last Bus: 23:50 (Sunday)

Indios Verdes to Dr. Gálvez

From Indios Verdes
- First Bus: 5:00 (Monday-Friday)
- Last Bus: 21:24 (Monday-Friday)
- First Bus: 5:00 (Saturday)
- Last Bus: 22:37 (Saturday)
- First Bus: 5:08 (Sunday)
- Last Bus: 23:02 (Sunday)

To Indios Verdes
- First Bus: 4:37 (Monday-Friday)
- Last Bus: 22:40 (Monday-Friday)
- First Bus: 4:30 (Saturday)
- Last Bus: 22:38 (Saturday)
- First Bus: 5:03 (Sunday)
- Last Bus: 22:40 (Sunday)

Buenavista to El Caminero

To El Caminero
- First Bus: 5:30 (Monday-Friday)
- Last Bus: 22:28 (Monday-Friday)
- First Bus: 6:00 (Saturday)
- Last Bus: 21:54 (Saturday)
- First Bus: 6:20 (Sunday)
- Last Bus: 21:54 (Sunday)

From El Caminero
- First Bus: 5:01 (Monday-Friday)
- Last Bus: 21:11 (Monday-Friday)
- First Bus: 4:50 (Saturday)
- Last Bus: 20:43 (Saturday)
- First Bus: 5:34 (Sunday)
- Last Bus: 20:38 (Sunday)

Colonia del Valle to Tepalcates (Line 2)

To Tepalcates
- First Bus: 4:45 (Monday-Friday)
- Last Bus: 22:55 (Monday-Friday)
- First Bus: 4:50 (Saturday)
- Last Bus: 23:43 (Saturday)
- First Bus: 5:29 (Sunday)
- Last Bus: 23:50 (Sunday)

To Colonia del Valle
- First Bus: 4:35 (Monday-Friday)
- Last Bus: 21:28 (Monday-Friday)
- First Bus: 4:30 (Saturday)
- Last Bus: 23:28 (Saturday)
- First Bus: 5:05 (Sunday)
- Last Bus: 23:39 (Sunday)

Line 1 services the Gustavo A. Madero, Cuauhtémoc, Benito Juárez, Álvaro Obregón, Coyoacán and Tlalpan municipalities.

=== Station list ===
Key (Note: The following list was adapted from different websites and official maps.: Metro connections obtained from the official Mexico City Metro system map.; Accessibility obtained from the Mexico City Metro system map. In some cases, the map omits the accessibility icon as the station(s) are actually partially accessible. However, the respective websites of each station on the official site indicate the respective accessibility methods. Stations with the symbol are fully accessible; stations with the symbol are partially accessible.; Cablebús obtained from their official website.; Centro de transferencia modal (CETRAM;) obtained from the official website of the Órgano Regulador de Transporte.; Ecobici obtained from their official website.; Metrobús obtained from the Mexico City Metrobús system map.; Mexibús obtained from the official Mexico City Metro system map.; Mexicable obtained from the official Mexico City Metro system map.; Public buses network (peseros) obtained from the official website of the Órgano Regulador de Transporte.; Red de Transporte de Pasajeros obtained from their official website.; Trolleybuses obtained from their official website.)
Handicapped/disabled access	Fully accessible station	Cablebús Line {{{3}}}	Cablebús connection	Red de Transporte de Pasajeros	RTP connection
Handicapped/disabled access	Partially accessible station	Mexibús	Mexibús connection	Tren Interurbano	Tren Interurbano connection
Transfer hub	CETRAM transfer station	Mexicable	Mexicable connection	Tren Suburbano	Tren Suburbano connection
Transfer hub	ETRAM transfer station	Mexico City Metro	Mexico City Metro connection	Trolleybus	Trolleybus connection
Ecobici	Ecobici bikeshare	Mexico City minubus	Pesero connection	Xochimilco Light Rail	Xochimilco Light Rail connection

Stations (Note: All the stations are fully accessible to people with disabilities.)	Connections	Neighborhood(s)	Municipality	Picture	Date opened
Indios Verdes (Note: New station in operation from 7 April 2024.)	101, 101A, 101B, 101D, 102, 107B (at distance), 108	Residencial Zacatenco	Gustavo A. Madero		19 June 2005
Deportivo 18 de Marzo	15B	Lindavista; Tepeyac Insurgentes	Gustavo A. Madero		19 June 2005
Euzkaro	15A, 15B	Magdalena de las Salinas; Industrial	Gustavo A. Madero		19 June 2005
Potrero	25, 104; 15C	Capultitán; Guadalupe Insurgentes	Gustavo A. Madero		19 June 2005
La Raza	11A (at distance), 12 (at distance), 23, 27A, 103; 7D (at distance), 20C, 20D	Vallejo	Gustavo A. Madero		19 June 2005
Circuito	200; 7D (at distance), 20A, 20D	Santa María Insurgentes	Cuauhtémoc		19 June 2005
San Simón	20B (at distance)	Santa María Insurgentes; San Simón Tolnáhuac	Cuauhtémoc		19 June 2005
Manuel González	10B	Colonia Atlampa; Tlatelolco	Cuauhtémoc		19 June 2005
Buenavista	(at Buenavista); 10E, 11C, 12B; (at distance)	Santa María la Ribera; Buenavista	Cuauhtémoc		19 June 2005
El Chopo	(at Alcaldía Cuauhtémoc); (at distance)	Santa María la Ribera; Buenavista	Cuauhtémoc		19 June 2005
Revolución	(at México Tenochtitlan); 12B (at distance), 16A, 16B; (at distance)	Santa María la Ribera; Buenavista	Cuauhtémoc		19 June 2005
Plaza de la República (Note: Formerly named "Tabacalera".)	12B; (at distance)	San Rafael; Tabacalera	Cuauhtémoc		19 June 2005
Reforma	19H (at distance); (at distance)	San Rafael; Tabacalera	Cuauhtémoc		19 June 2005
Hamburgo	Mexico City Metrobús Mexico City Metrobús Line 7 Ecobici	Juárez	Cuauhtémoc		19 June 2005
Glorieta de los Insurgentes	(at Insurgentes); 34A; 18C (at distance), 19E, 19F, 19G, 19H	Juárez; Roma Norte	Cuauhtémoc		19 June 2005
Durango	19, 19A	Roma Norte	Cuauhtémoc		19 June 2005
Álvaro Obregón	(at Insurgentes)	Roma Norte	Cuauhtémoc		19 June 2005
Sonora	19, 19A	Hipódromo; Roma Norte	Cuauhtémoc		19 June 2005
Campeche	Ecobici	Hipódromo; Roma Sur	Cuauhtémoc		19 June 2005
Chilpancingo	9C, 9E	Hipódromo; Roma Sur	Cuauhtémoc		19 June 2005
Nuevo León	Mexico City Metrobús Mexico City Metrobús Line 2 Ecobici	Hipódromo; Roma Sur	Cuauhtémoc		19 June 2005
La Piedad	Ecobici	Nápoles; Del Valle Norte	Benito Juárez		19 June 2005
Poliforum	Ecobici	Nápoles; Del Valle Norte	Benito Juárez		19 June 2005
Nápoles	Ecobici	Nápoles; Del Valle Centro	Benito Juárez		19 June 2005
Colonia del Valle	Ecobici	Nápoles; Insurgentes San Borja	Benito Juárez		19 June 2005
Ciudad de los Deportes	Ecobici	Ciudad de los Deportes; Insurgentes San Borja	Benito Juárez		19 June 2005
Parque Hundido	Ecobici	Noche Buena; Tlacoquemécatl	Benito Juárez		19 June 2005
Félix Cuevas	(at Insurgentes Sur); (at Insurgentes Sur); 6A (at distance)	Extremadura Insurgentes; Tlacoquemécatl	Benito Juárez		19 June 2005
Río Churubusco	1D, 120, 121A, 200; 22A	Insurgentes Mixcoac; Actipán	Benito Juárez		19 June 2005
Teatro Insurgentes		San José Insurgentes; Crédito Constructor	Benito Juárez		19 June 2005
José María Velasco	6A	Guadalupe Inn; Florida	Álvaro Obregón		19 June 2005
Francia		Guadalupe Inn; Florida	Álvaro Obregón		19 June 2005
Olivo		Guadalupe Inn; Florida	Álvaro Obregón		19 June 2005
Altavista	116A	Guadalupe Inn; Florida	Álvaro Obregón		19 June 2005
La Bombilla	21D (at distance), 34B	San Ángel; Chimalistac	Álvaro Obregón		19 June 2005
Dr. Gálvez	13A, 21D (at distance), 34B, 125, 128	Barrio Loreto; Chimalistac	Álvaro Obregón		19 June 2005
Ciudad Universitaria	Trolleybus Trolleybus Line 7	Ciudad Universitaria	Coyoacán		13 March 2008
Centro Cultural Universitario		Ciudad Universitaria	Coyoacán		13 March 2008
Perisur	57A	Insurgentes Cuicuilco	Coyoacán		13 March 2008
Villa Olímpica		Villa Olímpica; Peña Pobre	Tlalpan		13 March 2008
Corregidora		Tlalpan; La Lonja	Tlalpan		13 March 2008
Ayuntamiento		Tlalpan; La Fama	Tlalpan		13 March 2008
Fuentes Brotantes		Santa Úrsula Xitla; Tlalpan	Tlalpan		13 March 2008
Santa Úrsula		Santa Úrsula Xitla; Tlalpan	Tlalpan		13 March 2008
La Joya		Santa Úrsula Xitla; Tlalpan	Tlalpan		13 March 2008
El Caminero	2A, 17E, 17F, 69, 111A, 131, 132, 134, 134A, 134B, 134C, 134D	La Joya	Tlalpan		13 March 2008

=== Operators ===
Line 1 has four operators.

- Corredor Insurgentes, SA de CV (CISA)
- Vanguardia y Cambio, SA de CV (VYC)
- Rey Cuauhtémoc, SA de CV (RECSA)
- Red de Transporte de Pasajeros del Distrito Federal (RTP)

== Ridership ==
As of April 2018, the Metrobus Line 1 moves an average of 600,000 commuters daily. This has led to a saturation of the line, thus articulated buses are being substituted for bi-articulated buses.

== Incidents ==
According to the director of CISA, there are between one and four minor accidents per week in Line 1.

In February 2018, a cyclist was hit by a bus when he invaded the Metrobús' right-of-way near Perisur. The cyclist died immediately after the incident.
