= World Trade Center Mexico City =

Office and retail complex in Mexico

Coordinates: 19.3945°N 99.1744°W

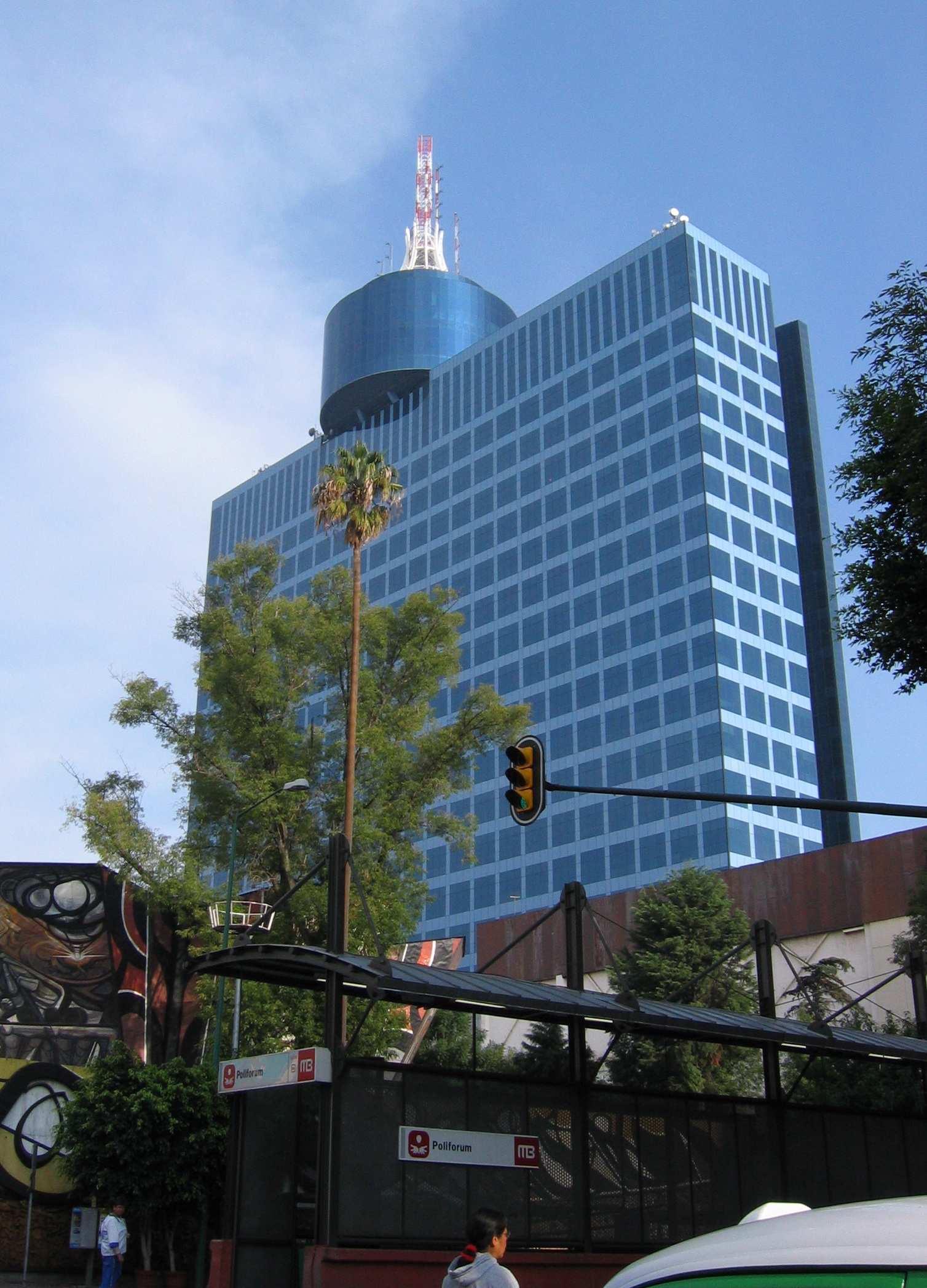
- Exterior of the building (c.2006)
- Alternative names: Centro Internacional de Exposiciones y Convenciones WTC Ciudad de México; Pepsi Center WTC

General information
- Status: Completed
- Location: Colonia Nápoles, Benito Juárez, Filadelfia S/N, Montecito 38; 03810 Mexico City; Mexico
- Construction started: 1966
- Opened: 1972 (as Hotel de México)
- Renovated: 1992–1995

Height
- Antenna spire: 218 m (715 ft)
- Roof: 191 m (627 ft)
- Top floor: 172 m (564 ft)

Technical details
- Floor count: 50
- Floor area: 23,900 m^{2} (257,000 sq ft)
- Lifts/elevators: 35

Design and construction
- Architects: Guillermo Rossell de la Lama; Ramon Miquela Jauregui
- Developer: Eureka; Escala Internacional; Gutsa

Other information
- Seating capacity: CIEC: Auditorio HIR: 370; Sala Mexica: 3,030; Pepsi Center: Overall: 7,505; Theater: 3,478; General admission: 6,699; Reserved: 4,284
- Public transit: Poliforum BRT station

The World Trade Center Mexico City, commonly known by its former name, Hotel de México, is a building complex located in the wealthy neighborhood of Colonia Nápoles in central Mexico City. Its most famous and recognizable feature is the 50-story, 172-metre (564 ft) high Torre WTC, the biggest building in the local area. It is the third tallest building in Mexico City when including antenna, and at its roof height, it stands 218 metres (715 ft).

The complex includes a convention center, cultural center, parking facilities, a multi-screen cinema, a revolving 45th-floor luxury restaurant and 44th floor observation gallery, and a shopping center with a supermarket and a Sears (originally opened as a JCPenney, the first location outside of the USA) as an anchor tenant. It also includes a 22-floor hotel, and will share some amenities with the slightly taller 48-story Polyforum Tower, currently under construction.

Located on Avenida de los Insurgentes, the complex is served by the Poliforum station of the Metrobús Bus rapid transit system, located a few meters away. The station is named after the Polyforum Cultural Siqueiros, a part of the WTC complex.

== History ==
The WTC México began its existence as the Hotel de México, a building and complex that did not perform as intended.

Construction of the Hotel de México was in a lot called "Parque de La Lama" located in the Nápoles neighborhood (Spanish: Colonia Nápoles). The lot was set aside by real estate businessperson, José Jerónimo de La Lama in 1947. However, by 1966, when the project started, the owner and financial sponsor was Manuel Suárez y Suárez.

The Hotel de México project included a hotel building as well as a cultural center housing the Polyforum Cultural Siqueiros and several other facilities aimed at making the complex a hub for business, culture, tourism, and architecture. Plans for the complex were presented at the 13th international architecture contest in Munich.

Projected to be ready for the 1968 Olympics, the project overran and exceeded its budget. Although the main tower was completed in 1972, it did not function as a hotel, due to political and economic reasons. The tower–as well as the rest of the complex–was left in an unfinished state, aside from the Polyforum.

In the mid-1980s, a project was started to turn the Hotel de México complex into an international business center. Mr. Suárez backed the idea, and although he died in 1988, the remodeling began with partial public funding in 1992. In 1995, the complex–now known as World Trade Center México–opened its doors with the tower functioning as an office building and convention center.

Floors 40 and 41 housed TV studios for Corporación de Noticias e Información, which operated XHTVM Canal 40. On May 19, 2005, these floors were evacuated after the beginning of a strike at CNI. Due to the legal cases that have followed CNI since 2005, the facilities have remained untouched since.

The WTC also houses the transmission facilities for XEW-FM, XEQ-FM, XEX-FM and XHFO-FM.

Most recently, the World Trade Center added a second theater: the 7,500-seat Pepsi Center WTC, which was completed in 2012. It is used primarily for concerts and stage shows.

=== Functions ===
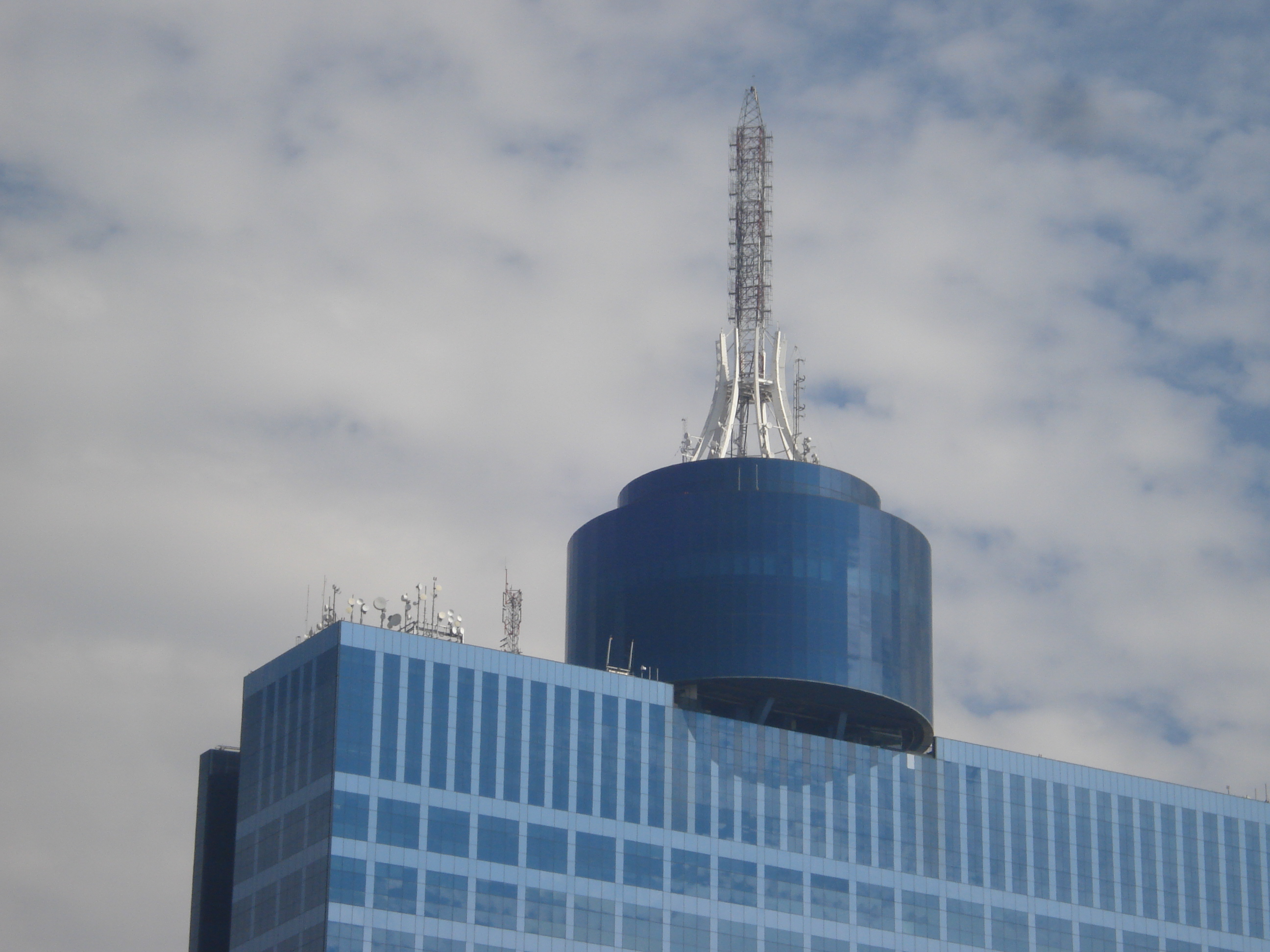
Antenna and spiral tower. The XHFO-FM antenna shown here is the one replaced in 2009, which brings the building's height to 218 meters.

WTC Tower has a seismic detector that monitors land movements to stop elevators during earthquakes.

The tower is managed by a system that controls the facilities and equipment. This includes the electrics, mechanical ventilation, sanitation, elevators and fire protection.

== See also ==
- List of tallest buildings in Mexico City
