= Escandón =

Mexico City colonia

Coordinates: 19.401951°N 99.182209°W

- Neighborhood of Mexico City
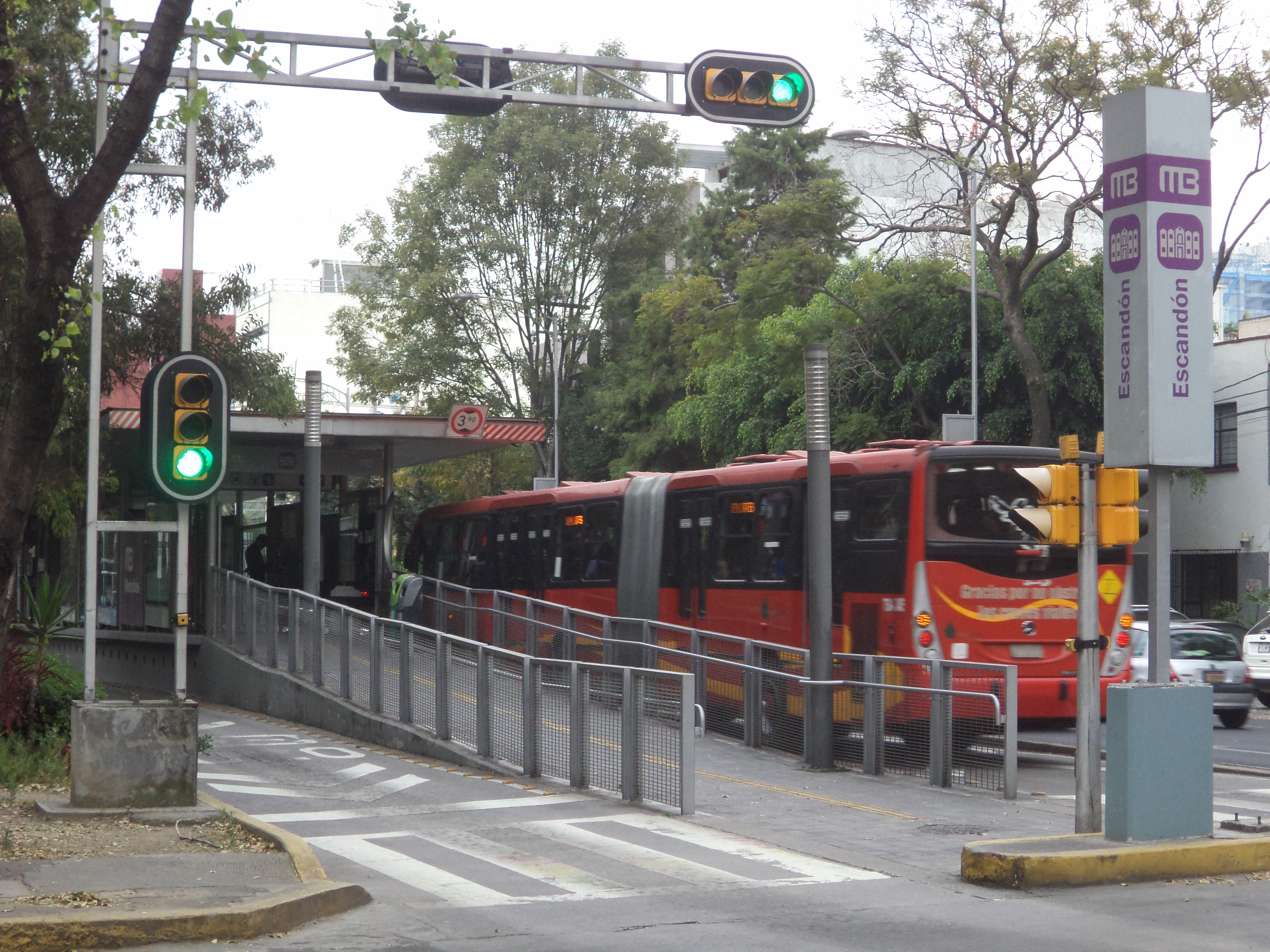
- Metrobús station in Escandón
- Interactive map of Escandón
- Country: Mexico
- City: Mexico City
- Borough: Miguel Hidalgo

Population (2020)
  - Total: 75,720

Escandón is one of the colonias of Mexico City that were founded at the beginning of the 19th century on crop terrains that were formerly part of Hacienda de la Condesa, belonging to Condesa de Miravalle. This colony formed part of the Hacienda de la Condesa, being property of the family Escandón, who fractionated the terrains situated south of this. In 1841 it was sold to Antonio Batres and then sold to Estanislao and Joaquín Flores. The Flores brothers sold the hacienda to Manuel Escandón's notary in 1869. When the Escandón family acquired the property it got fragmented in 1880, 1890 and 1891 to be put for sale in lots.

The neighbourhood is divided in two: Escandón I and Escandón II due to its big extension. The first section is located from the Patriotismo Avenue and confines with the Tacubaya neighbourhood; whereas the second section extends from the Viaducto Miguel Alemán and confines with the Condesa Neighbourhood. Escandón II has seen greater economic and social success.

The neighbourhood still preserves some of the constructions that were built in the first half of the 20th century, particularly from architectural styles as: art decó, colonial Californian, and the neocolonial. At the north, given the vicinity to the Tacubaya neighbourhood, some examples of constructions that correspond to the eclectic architecture can be appreciated. The greater part of the buildings constructed around the middle of the 20th century correspond to apartment buildings.

As many other neighbourhoods founded in the first half of the 20th century, Escandón has several services and businesses that aim to attend the local population; some examples of this are the Jardín Morelos park and the market established in front of it. In recent times, the neighbourhood has experimented a development in real-estate activities because it is near neighbourhoods of medium-high and high economic levels, like Condesa, Roma, Nápoles and del Valle.

== Location ==
Colonia Escandón lies in an almost entirely flat terrain that skirts the Lomas of Tacubaya (belonging to the terrains of Lomas of Chapultepec) and the bank of the Lake of Chapultepec. It is delimited by the following avenues and neighborhoods: in the north by Eje 4 Sur Benjamín Franklin, Baja California Avenue and Colonia Condesa; south, by Viaducto Miguel Alemán and the Colonia San Pedro de los Pinos, along with the Colonia Nápoles; to the east, by Nuevo León Avenue and Colonia Roma; and west by Revolución Avenue and Tacubaya.

The neighbourhood is part of the Miguel Hidalgo delegation of Mexico City.

In addition to the security and accommodation, the geographic location of the colony turns it into a good alternative for tourists in the large and agglomerated Mexico City; whether the city is visited by pleasure or by businesses, its roads of access connect it with a considerable quantity of tourist attractions and centres of businesses, that include two lines of system of metropolitan transport (or Metro), the Metrobús, Ecobici, as well as several routes of buses, included the Bicentenario line that runs along the Circuito Interior.

Its excellent location has made real-estate prices to rise every day, particularly since the earthquake that happened on 19 September 2017 and because of its convenient location.

== Division ==
Colonia Escandón is divided in two by Patriotismo Avenue. On the east side the streets bear the names Comercio, Agricultura and Minería as well as those of some social movements (such as Unión and Agrarismo) and of some professions (Arquitectos, Ingenieros). On the west side, the names of the streets correspond to important figures in the history of Mexico and Latin America, such as Salvador Alvarado and José Martí. Other streets are named for significant dates, like 11 de Abril (11 April), or 28 de Agosto (28 August). Up until the end of the 20th century, the residents of each street organised parties on the corresponding dates where they put out flags and shared food.

== History ==
Founded at the beginnings of the 20th century, the terrains that formed part of one of the most known haciendas and of greater extension in the west zone of the Valley of Mexico, the Hacienda de la Condesa, were oriented South. It is known that the outline and division of the terrains were made by the Escandón Barrón brothers, whose family kept an intense activity in the creation of fraccionamientos and the real-state business in Mexico City since the end of the Porfiriato.

Located in the vicinities of the then populated neighbourhood of Tacubaya, considered place of entertainment of the high society of the capital, Escandón was urbanized in a faster way on the west side, in which some villas were built. Beautiful residences of the final 19th century are conserved, of which a lot of have been destroyed to build high cost apartment buildings. The Colonia Escandón is considered as one of the neighbourhoods of greatest Mexican ancestry.

With the end of the Mexican Revolution and the growth of Mexico City, the development and population of the rest of the colony began. In the decade of 1930, between the Insurgentes, Nuevo León and Benjamín Franklin Avenues and the Sindicalismo street, the first fraccionamiento (division) of Mexico City was established and named Insurgentes-Ejército Nacional, with houses in terrains that go from 140 to 380 square metres. The names of the fraccionamientos, as well as the streets', are due to the fact that it was created so that generals, colonels, and other revolutionary soldiers of high rank could have their houses, which made that this small zone renowned. In fact, some of their descendants still live in the same houses.

The destruction of these architectonic features is growing day by day, which has caused its inhabitants (some belonging to third or fourth generations) to unite to prevent construction businesses from acquiring these houses to demolish them and build luxury apartment buildings that, due to its location, makes them highly demanded. One of the chalets of the Sindicalismo street has been demolished despite the protests and the protection of the INAH.

Many famous personalities and celebrities have lived in Escandon. When the Cristero War ended, the Catholic church Espíritu Santo was the first to ring its bells. Its construction, dating from the beginning of the 20th century, and its inner decoration, are a national heritage object.

It has been a neighbourhood of renowned artists, creators, publicists, lawyers and scholars. The characteristic small businesses that make of the neighbourhood a small village in the large and big Mexico City still survive by the local support, however this 21st century is making the situation to change given the high demand of the zone, to which some people already call "the new Condesa". Its inhabitants are protecting the original name.

== Transport ==
The routes of the Network of Transport of Passengers (RTP) of the Federal District, that go through the neighbourhood, correspond to the routes of the Zona SurPoniente M-15, and are the Route 13-To and the Route 115-To.

The nearest subway stations belong to the ones of the line 9 of the Subway of Mexico City. Both are found in the Northern part of the neighbourhood and are the stations of Patriotismo and Chilpancingo, which is found in the limits of the Colonia Escandón with the Condesa and Roma.

The stations of the Metrobús of the Federal District are located in the eastern part of the colony, in the Insurgentes Sur Avenue, in the Line 1 (Red Line); La Piedad and Nuevo León which is linked to Line 2 (Purple Line) that is situated in the northern part of the neighbourhood, which runs along the Benjamín Franklin Avenue. These stations are Nuevo León, Escandón and Patriotism.

On 17 February 2010 the system Ecobici was inaugurated in the Federal District. The bike stations 77 (Choapan and Tamaulipas) and 83 (New León and Alfonso Reyes) are the nearest to the neighbourhood.

On 7 November 2011 the plan of enlargement of the service Ecobici was officially announced, with new stations to be added to Escandón.

Since March 2015, the fourth generation stations of Ecobici were installed. The roads were improved and new signals for cyclists were also installed. Until December 2015 there were 11 stations existing in the neighborhood: 7 in Escandón II and 4 in Escandon I. These stations correspond to the 166, 167, 170 and 172 in Escandón I and 168, 169, 171, 173, 175, 181 and 182 in Escandón II.

== Places of interest ==
One of the main places of interest is the street José Martí, in which the Theatre Sandoval shows children plays; likewise, the church, the market and the cantina "El Fuerte de la Colonia", and small marisquerías and breweries, that are evidence of a place of people of medium class. Also on the street José Martí and passing the Patriotism Avenue, the famous cantina "El León de Oro" can be visited.

On Tuesdays, the open-air market is installed in the street of José Martí, and for the celebration of the Parroquia del Espíritu Santo a fair is installed with food and fair games. The street José Martí is the hallway of trade and food, therefore antojitos, juices, bakeries, or restaurants of Mexican food of greater preparation can be obtained.

Often, on Sundays, the lateral lanes of the Patriotismo Avenue are closed, to allow cyclists to follow their way up to the Forest of Chapultepec.

Also the Fiesta Inn Hotel is another landmark in the corner of José Martí and Insurgentes Avenue, as well as the Angeles Hospital Mexico, which is on the street of Agrarismo.

On the street of Sindicalismo, the Junior Fitness Center is found holding a wide variety of installations: 14 tennis courts, a semi olympic-size swimming pool, saunas, gymnasium, pool for kids, a jacuzzi and a squash room, among others.

As part of the remodelling in all the colony during the period of Gabriela Cuevas Barrón, the construction of the "Faro del Saber Escandón", located at the center of the Jardín Morelos park began. The building harbours the following services:

- Library
- Cultural workshops
- Social workshops

The main aim of the institution is to approach the citizens to reading and cultural services of quality, with the creation of the building with a modern architectural style. As part of the programme, the park was modernized; they replanted the green areas, the children's playgrounds and some skateboarding facilities were built for the youth.

In addition to the breweries, marisquerías have been installed through all the colony, one of the biggest is found inside the market, and the smallest, in front of the Hospital Angeles Mexico, in the street of Agrarismo.

There is a small venue in the corner of José Martí and Minería called "El Vitaminas", where broths of beef are served with tortillas of handmade corn, which are not expensive.

The Mexican Institute of the Audition and the Language can also be found on the street of Progreso.

=== Pulquerías ===
In Escandón I the pulquería "El Pirata" is located, between the streets 13 de Septiembre and the street 11 de Abril, one block away from Viaducto Piedad, on the Patriotismo Avenue. Its interior still preserves the sawdust all over the floor, tiles in the walls, a jukebox, the wooden barrels where the pulque is stored. The pulque is served in glass jars for those who are drinking it there or in plastic glasses for those who are taking-out. They offer curados made of oat and seasonal fruits. The different sauces offered in a molcajete are also appreciated, especially the salsa borracha, prepared also with pulque, that is enjoyed as an appetizer.

=== Other places of interest ===
Another point of interest is the Sports Centre "Valle Escandón", in which sports-related and recreational activities are offered at low costs, as well as indoor football tournaments for all ages. It is a place to meet for the families that live in the neighbourhoods and its surroundings.

== See also ==
- Mexico City
- Iztapalapa
- Colonia (Mexico)
- Colonia Las Peñas
- Colonia Portales
- Colonia del Valle (Federal District)
- Colonia del Valle
- Colonia Narvarte
- Colonia Nápoles
- Colonia Roma
- Colonia Condesa
- Colonia Viaducto Piedad
- Colonia Álamos
- Colonia San Ángel
- Colonia Escandón
- Colonia San Pedro de los Pinos
- Colonia Cuauhtémoc
- Colonia San Rafael
- Colonia Agrícola Oriental (Mexico City)
- Colonia Mixcoac
- Colonia Agrícola Pantitlán
