= Miguel Alemán =

Miguel Alemán may refer to:

- Miguel Alemán González (1884–1929), general in the Mexican Revolution; father of:
- Miguel Alemán Valdés (1900–1983), president of Mexico from 1946 to 1952; father of:
- Miguel Alemán Velasco (born 1932), governor of Veracruz from 1998 to 2004; father of:
- Miguel Alemán Magnani, owner of low-cost airline Interjet

== Named for them ==
- Estadio Miguel Alemán Valdés, sports stadium in Celaya, Guanajuato
- Miguel Alemán, Tamaulipas, a city and municipality in the state of Tamaulipas
- Viaducto Miguel Alemán, east–west expressway in Mexico City
- Lake Miguel Alemán, in the state of Oaxaca
- Miguel Alemán Dam, on the Tonto River in the state of Oaxaca

== Unrelated ==
- José Miguel Alemán (born 1956), Panamanian politician
- Miguel Alemán (chess player) (1906–1979), Cuban chess player
