= Patriotismo metro station =

Mexico City metro station

Patriotismo
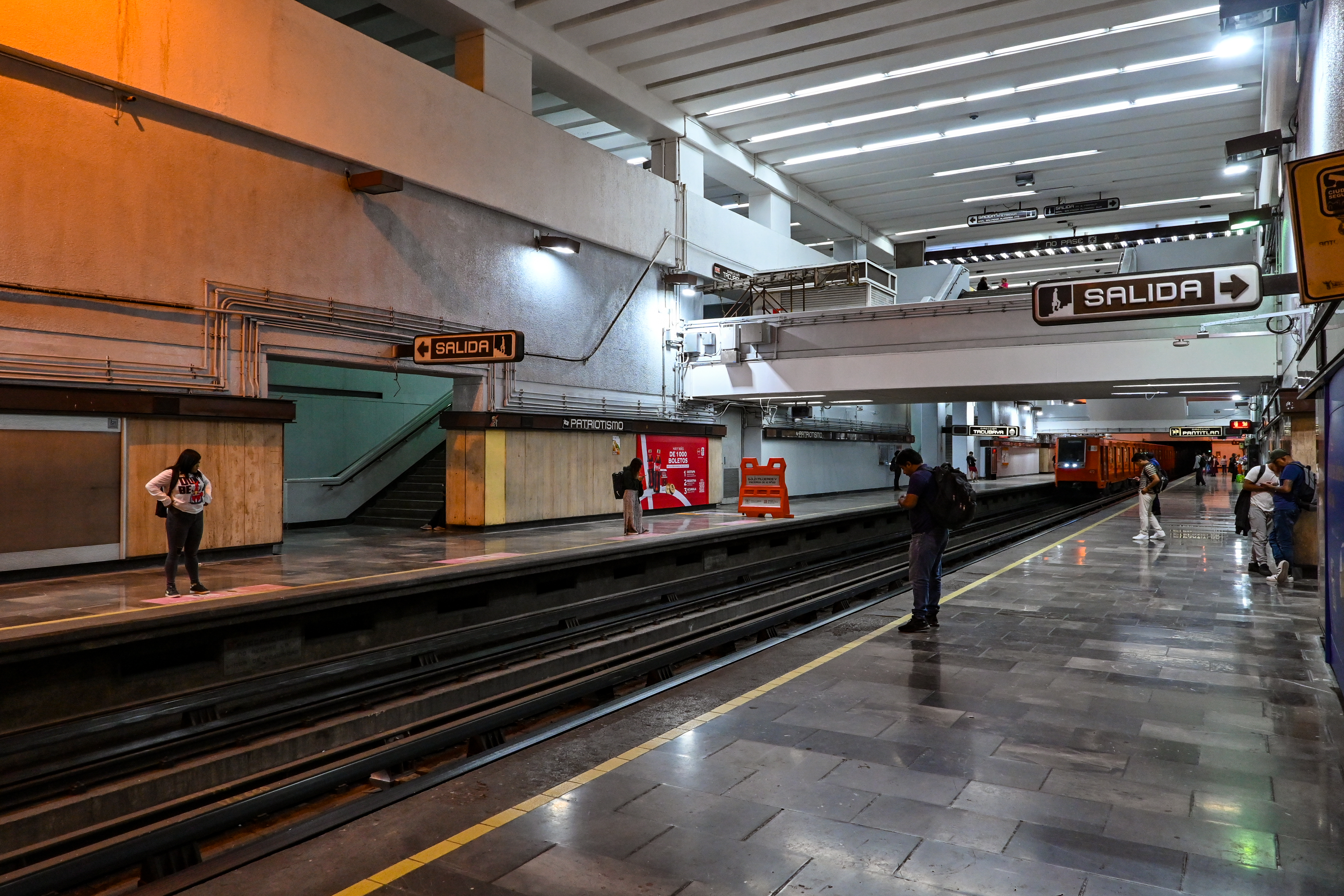
- Station as of June 2025

General information
- Coordinates: 19.4062°N 99.1789°W
- System: Mexico City Metro
- Platforms: 2 side platforms
- Tracks: 2
- Connections: Patriotismo

Construction
- Structure type: Underground
- Platform levels: 1
- Accessible: Partial

Other information
- Status: In service

History
- Opened: 29 August 1988; 37 years ago

Passengers
- 2025: 5,927,230 (Note: The data here is limited to the most recent ten years to avoid excessive listings; earlier figures can be found in this page's history or on the Mexico City Metro website. To calculate the average daily ridership, the annual total is divided by 365 days (366 in leap years), with decimals omitted from the result. Each station per line is ranked individually, as the system counts transfer stations separately. The percentage change is calculated automatically using the data from the current year and the previous year.) ▲3.24%
- Rank: 80/195

Services
Preceding station	Mexico City Metro	Following station
Tacubaya Terminus	Line 9	Chilpancingo toward Pantitlán
Route map
Location
- Location within Mexico City
- Area map

Patriotismo (Spanish: Estación Patriotismo) is a metro station on the Mexico City Metro. It is located in both the Cuauhtémoc and Miguel Hidalgo boroughs of Mexico City. It is part of the Metro Line 9.

== Name and iconography ==
The station is named after Avenida Patriotismo which divides the Cuauhtémoc and Miguel Hidalgo boroughs. "Patriotismo" literally means patriotism, thus, the station logo depicts a Mexican flag.

When Line 9 was on its planning stage, the name for the station was Escandón, after Colonia Escandón, the neighborhood the station is located at, but it was later changed to Patriotismo.

== General information ==
The station serves the Escandón, Hipódromo Condesa, and Condesa neighborhoods; it is located at the intersection of Benjamin Franklin Street and General Salvador Alvarado Street.The station has two exits on both sides of Benjamin Franklin street. The station was opened on 29 August 1988.

=== Ridership ===
In 2019, the station registered an average of 18,160 users per day.

Annual passenger ridership
Year	Ridership	Average daily	Rank	% change	Ref.
2025	5,927,230	16,238	80/195	+3.24%
2024	5,741,128	15,686	79/195	+2.64%
2023	5,593,287	15,324	82/195	+7.99%
2022	5,179,243	14,189	85/195	+36.45%
2021	3,795,726	10,399	79/195	+1.14%
2020	3,753,074	10,254	99/195	−43.38%
2019	6,628,532	18,160	99/195	−0.39%
2018	6,654,316	18,231	98/195	+2.87%
2017	6,468,546	17,722	103/195	−1.24%
2016	6,549,633	17,895	103/195	−1.49%

== Exits ==
- North: Eje 4 Sur Benjamin Franklin and General Salvador Alvarado street, Col. Hipódromo Condesa
- South: Eje 4 Sur Benjamin Franklin and General Salvador Alvarado street, Colonia Escandón

== Gallery ==
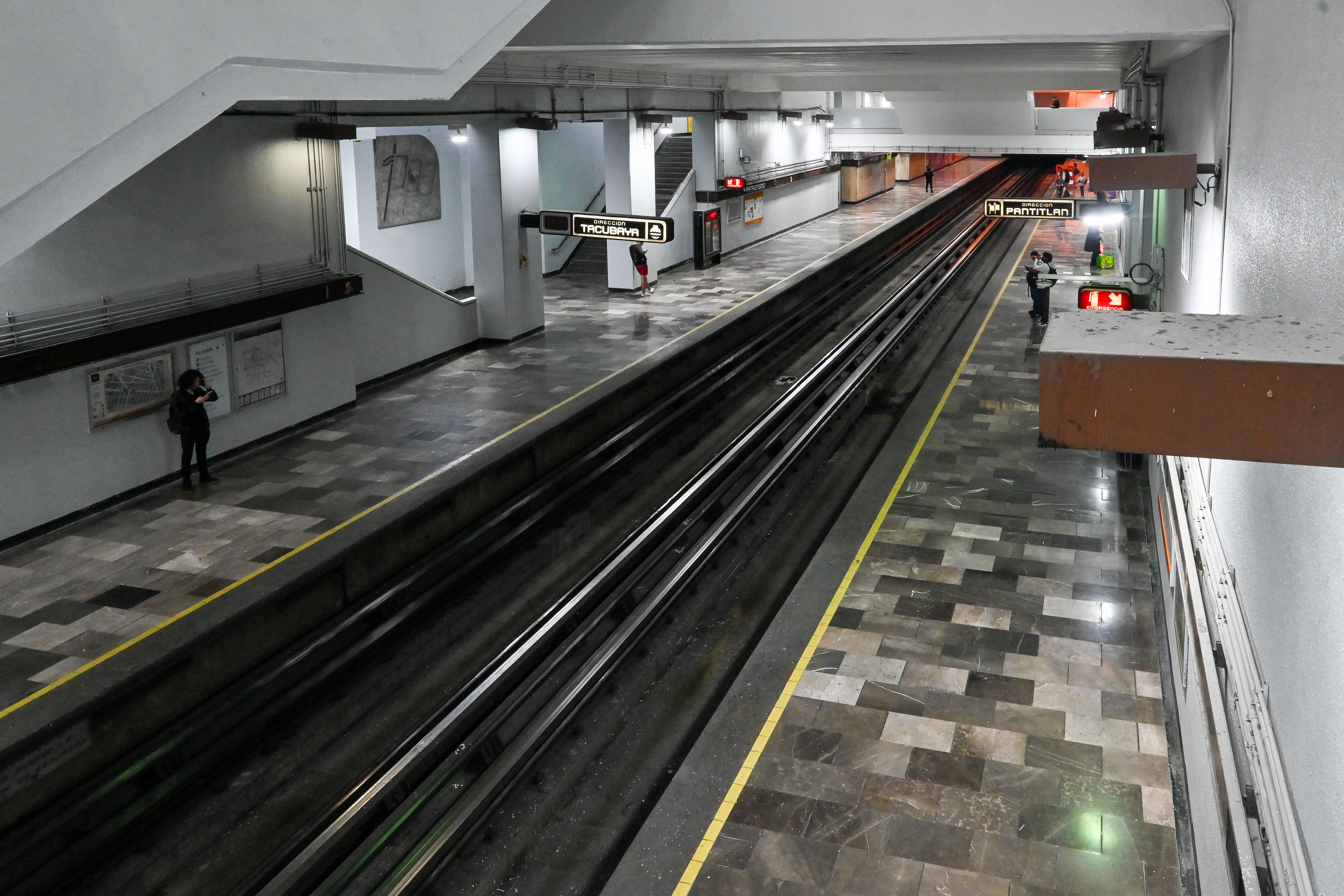
Station platform

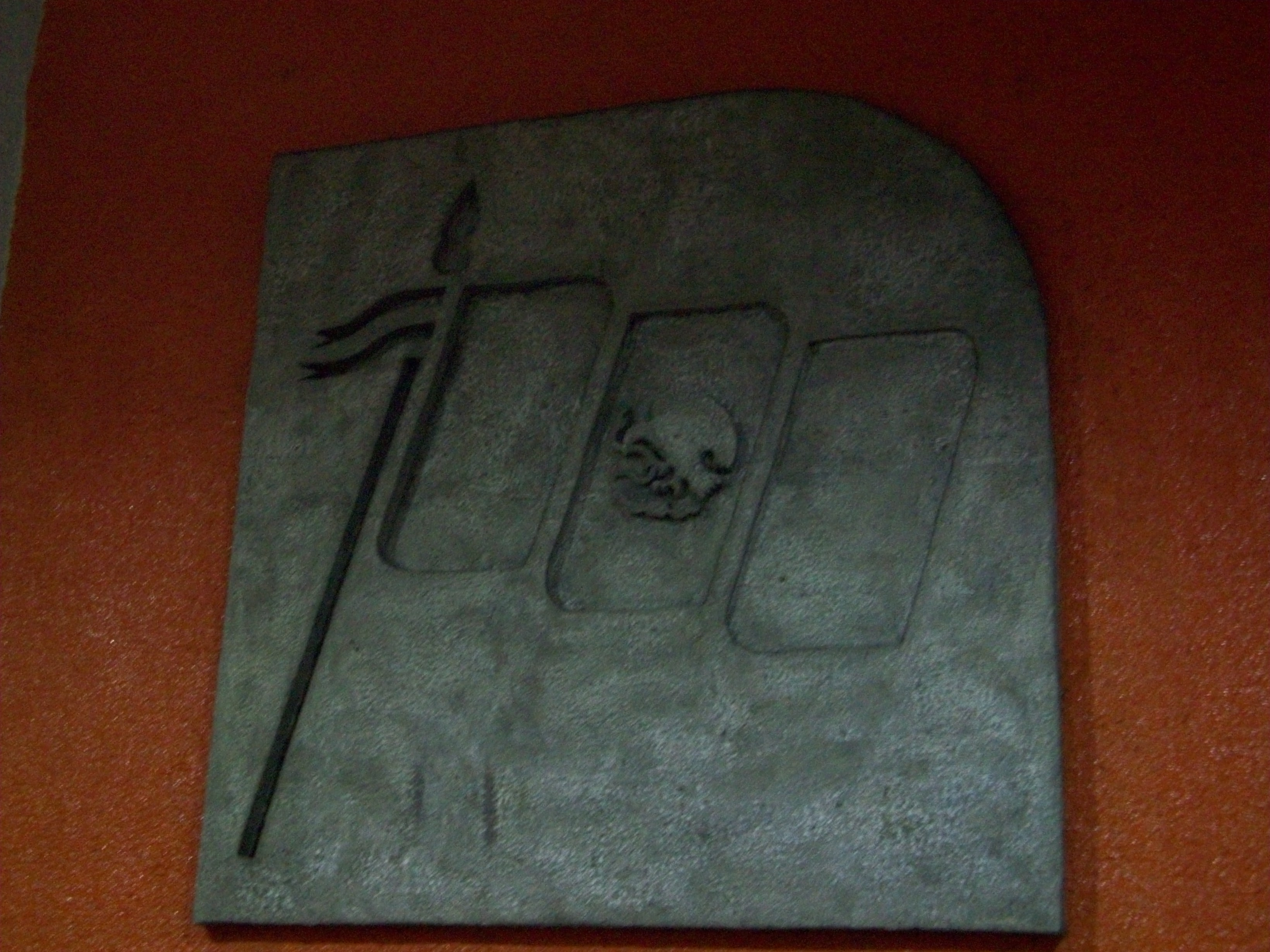
Stone engraving depicting the station's icon
