= Colonia Insurgentes San Borja =

Insurgentes San Borja
- Neighborhood of Mexico City
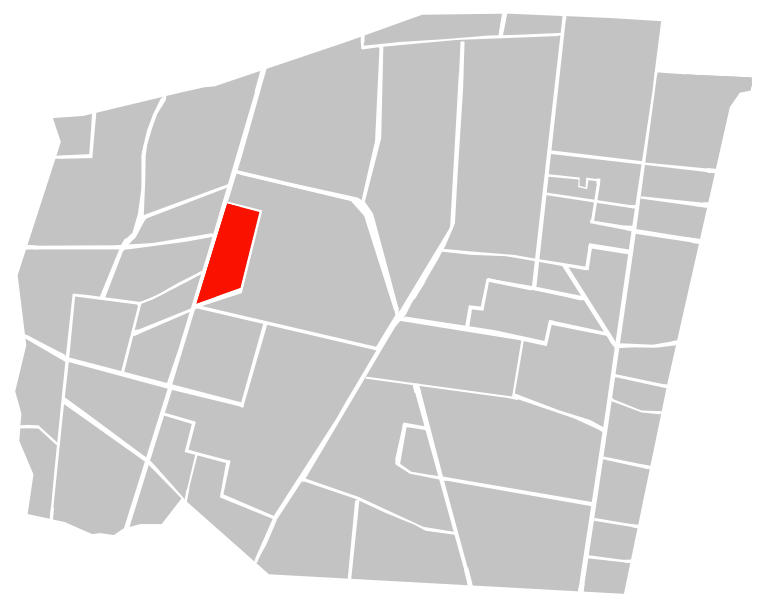
- Location of Insurgentes San Borja (in red) within Benito Juárez borough
- Country: Mexico
- City: Mexico City
- Municipality: Benito Juárez

Area
  - Total: 0.22 km^{2} (0.085 sq mi)

Population (2022)
  - Total: 788
- Postal code: 03100

Colonia Insurgentes San Borja is a neighborhood in Benito Juárez, Mexico City.

== Location ==
Colonia Insurgentes San Borja is located in the Benito Juárez borough, in southern Mexico City.

The neighborhood is bordered by:

- Eugenia street on the north, across which is Colonia del Valle Centro
- Avenida de los Insurgentes Sur on the west, across which is Colonia Ampliación Nápoles, Ciudad de los Deportes and Colonia Noche Buena
- Av. Porfirio Díaz on the south, across which is Colonia del Valle Centro
- Patricio Sainz street, across which is Colonia del Valle Centro

== Description ==
Insurgentes San Borja is a residential neighborhood. Most of its buildings are two-level houses dating back to the 1940s and 1950s, including some important examples of California colonial architecture, which can be also seen in surrounding colonias such as Colonia Nápoles and Colonia del Valle.

In recent years, nevertheless, a few houses have been demolished, being replaced with apartment buildings; despite this, the neighborhood still keeps its traditional architectural style and vibe.

The colonia is sometimes mistaken as being part of Colonia del Valle, due to the fact of Insurgentes San Borja being surrounded on the north, east and south by Colonia del Valle.

== History ==
In the mid-1920s, the Avenida de los Insurgentes was paved and extended to San Ángel, this led to the foundation of the Extremadura Insurgentes, Nápoles, Narvarte and Insurgentes San Borja colonias in the 1930s and 1940s.

Before that, the area that is now Colonia Insurgentes San Borja was part of an 18th-century hacienda called Hacienda de San Borja.

== Education ==
Colonia Insurgentes San Borja is home to a private university: Universidad Humanitas Del Valle Campus, despite the fact that, as mentioned before, it is located in Insurgentes San Borja, which itself is not part of Colonia del Valle.

== Transportation ==
=== Public transportation ===
The area is served by the Mexico City Metrobús and EcoBici bikeshare.

Metrobús stations

- Colonia del Valle
