= Chimalistac =

Neighborhood in Mexico City

- Colonia
- The pulpit bridge (Puente del Púlpito) on Paseo del Río
- Interactive map of Chimalistac
- Coordinates: 19.345°N 99.1856°W
- Country: Mexico
- City: Mexico City
- Borough: Álvaro Obregón
- Founded: Pre-Hispanic period
- Postal code: 01070

Chimalistac is a residential colonia (neighborhood) in the south of Mexico City, in the Álvaro Obregón borough. It consists of an old village of pre-Hispanic origin and an early 20th-century residential subdivision laid out on what had been the orchard of the Carmelite college of San Ángel. Its irregular street plan dates from that past, and many of its streets are still cobbled and carry little traffic. In 2012 its urban and architectural ensemble and its festivities were declared tangible and intangible cultural heritage of the city.

== Location ==
Chimalistac lies on the border of the Álvaro Obregón borough with the Coyoacán borough. It is bounded by Avenida Miguel Ángel de Quevedo to the north, Paseo del Río to the south and east, and Avenida de los Insurgentes to the west. Its neighbors are the colonias Agrícola to the north, Oxtopulco Universidad to the east, Fortín Chimalistac and Copilco el Bajo to the south, and San Ángel to the west. Its postal code is 01070.

The Magdalena River, which gave rise to the neighborhood's bridges, now runs piped beneath Paseo del Río, which is a tree-lined road.

Several bus routes run along Avenida Miguel Ángel de Quevedo. Mexico City Metrobús Line 1 runs along Avenida Insurgentes, with two nearby stations, La Bombilla and Doctor Gálvez. The nearest Metro station is Miguel Ángel de Quevedo.

== Name ==
Chimalistac is a Nahuatl place name combining chimalli, 'shield', and iztac, 'white', and translates as "place of the white shield".

== History ==
=== Pre-Hispanic and colonial periods ===
In the pre-Hispanic period Chimalistac belonged to Coyohuacan (Coyoacán), a settlement subjugated by the Tepanecs around 1332. In 1410 Tezozomoc, ruler of Azcapotzalco, raised Coyoacán to the rank of a lordship and installed his son Maxtla as its ruler. In 1426 Maxtla seized the throne of Azcapotzalco and turned on the Mexica city of Tenochtitlan and the Acolhua city of Texcoco. The Mexica and Acolhua joined forces and took Azcapotzalco in 1428; Maxtla fled to Coyoacán, where he was defeated in 1430. The lordship of Coyoacán and its dependent barrios—Chimalistac, Coapa, Tepetlapa, Axotla, Huitzilopochco (Churubusco), Xoco and Copilco—then became tributaries of the Triple Alliance of Texcoco, Tenochtitlan and Tlacopan.

Under the Triple Alliance, pre-Hispanic Coyoacán grew along the routes linking Churubusco with Chimalistac, Chimalistac with Mixcoac, and Chimalistac with Tenochtitlan.

At the time of the Spanish conquest, Coyoacán was ruled by the cacique Ixtolinque, son of Cuauhpopoca, the former Mexica governor of Coyoacán who had been executed by Hernán Cortés. Ixtolinque sided with the Spanish and, after the fall of Tenochtitlan, was baptized Juan de Guzmán Ixtolinque. He became an ally of Cortés, who settled in Coyoacán with his captains and army from 1521 to 1523 while Mexico City was being rebuilt.

In 1525 Cortés granted Juan de Guzmán Ixtolinque the lands that had belonged to his family, as a reward for his loyalty to the Spanish, and named him governor of Coyoacán, a title he held until his death in 1569. Among his many properties was an estate with a large orchard in Chimalistac. He was succeeded as governor by his son, Juan de Guzmán Ixtolinque the younger, who died in 1573. The orchard passed to his grandson, Felipe de Guzmán Ixtolinque, who in 1595 ceded a third of it to the Discalced Carmelites; shortly afterwards Andrés de Mondragón and his wife, Elvira Gutiérrez, bought the rest of the orchard and gave it to the order as well. On this land the Carmelites founded their college of theology and arts dedicated to Saint Anne, construction of which began in 1615.

The Carmelites kept the property until the Reform Laws.

== Government and urban development ==
The residential subdivision of the former Carmelite land, known as Huerta del Carmen, began in 1906.

The Organic Law of the Federal District and Territories, issued at the end of 1928 and in force from 1 January 1929, abolished the municipalities of the Federal District and divided its territory into a Central Department and thirteen delegaciones, among them San Ángel, to which Chimalistac belonged. It is now part of the Álvaro Obregón borough.

Urban growth absorbed the old village and the subdivision, although the neighborhood kept its own identity. A commercial corridor runs along Avenida Insurgentes and Avenida Miguel Ángel de Quevedo.

On 28 November 2012 the Federal District government issued a decree declaring Chimalistac tangible and intangible cultural heritage of the city. The decree states:

"The alleys, lanes, gardens, religious complexes, promenades, houses and, in general, the urban-architectural ensemble located in Colonia Chimalistac, Delegación Álvaro Obregón, are declared tangible cultural heritage of Mexico City; and the festivities, artistic expressions, recreational activities, popular fairs, traditions, art exhibitions, forms of community organization and other collective expressions belonging to the said colonia are declared intangible cultural heritage."

The declaration places restrictions on land use and on what may be built in the neighborhood.

The neighborhood's patron saint is Saint Sebastian, whose feast is held on 20 January.

== Historic monuments ==
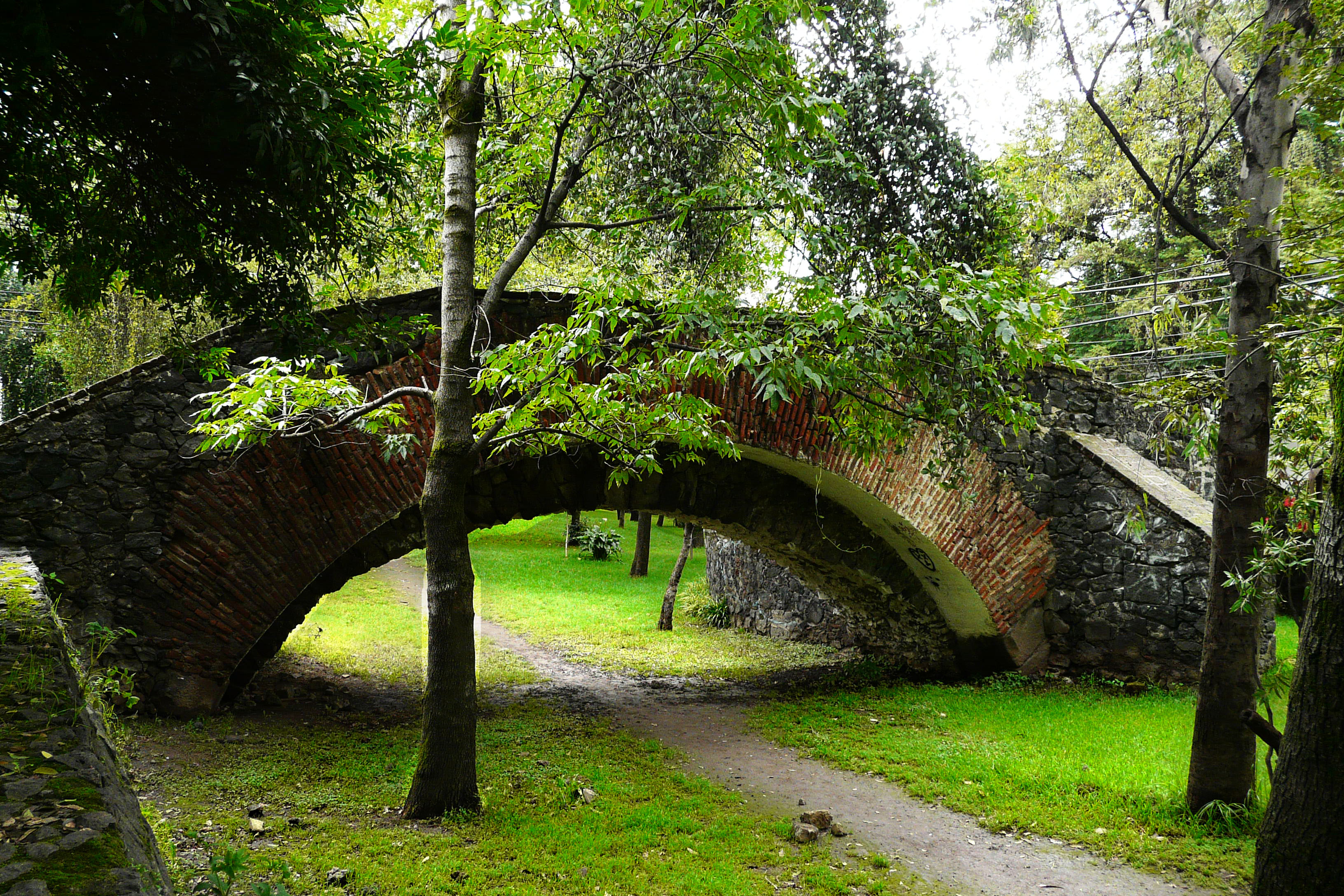
Bridge over Paseo del Río

Chimalistac has twelve buildings listed as historic monuments by the INAH, dating from the 17th, 18th and 19th centuries, as well as the Monument to Álvaro Obregón, built in 1935 in Parque de la Bombilla.

From the colonial period date the parish church of San Sebastián Mártir, the hermitage known as the Cámara de los secretos ("chamber of secrets"), and the mansion that houses the Carso Center for the Study of Mexican History. A plaque on the hermitage attributes it to Friar Andrés de San Miguel and dates it to 1620, but both claims have been questioned. Also listed are the atrial cross of the parish church; a stretch of the wall that enclosed the San Ángel college's orchard, preserved on the grounds of the Club España; and the four masonry bridges over Paseo del Río. The best known of these is the Puente del Púlpito (pulpit bridge), for its size and for the tradition attached to it: according to this, the friars rehearsed their sermons from the platform on the bridge, trying to make their voices heard over the noise of the river.

The houses at numbers 5, 101 and 186 Paseo del Río date from the 19th century and are examples of the country houses of the period; they are also historic monuments under Mexican law. So is the late-19th-century mansion at Calle del Carmen 1, which belonged to the publisher Ignacio Cumplido. The same lot holds two modern buildings that were the home of the architect Francisco Artigas; since 2003 the complex has housed the Casa de la Universidad de California en México of the University of California.

== Santa ==
Santa is a novel by Federico Gamboa, published in 1903, that made both its author and Chimalistac famous. The heroine comes from Chimalistac, where she lives with her family at the start of the novel and where she is buried at the end; most of the action takes place in the brothels of Mexico City. The novel gives a fairly faithful picture of Chimalistac in the early 20th century. It was a great success from the start and became closely tied to the area; writers such as José Emilio Pacheco regard it as the first Mexican bestseller. In 1923, in tribute to the book and its author, the San Sebastián square was renamed Plaza Federico Gamboa, and two nearby streets were named Santa and Callejón de Hipo, after the novel's main characters.

== In the arts ==
Chimalistac's main presence in film comes from the four screen adaptations of Santa. The 1932 version was long considered the first Mexican sound film; although at least seven earlier films had sound, it was the first with direct sound. The adaptations are:

- Santa (1918), directed by Luis G. Peredo
- Santa (1932), directed by Antonio Moreno
- Santa (1943), directed by Norman Foster and Alberto Gómez de la Vega
- Santa (1969), directed by Emilio Gómez Muriel

Paseo del Río, Plaza Federico Gamboa and the San Sebastián church have been recurring subjects for artists such as José María Velasco, Johann Moritz Rugendas and Ben-Hur Baz.

== Notable residents ==
- Francisco Artigas (1916–1999), architect and engineer, designer of many of the houses in Jardines del Pedregal. He lived at Calle del Carmen 1 and at Josefina Prior 32, in a house and studio he built himself.
- Ignacio Cumplido (1811–1887), publisher and printer
- Federico Gamboa (1864–1939), writer and diplomat
- Bárbara Jacobs (born 1947), writer
- Susana Zabaleta, actress and singer
- José Antonio Meade (born 1969), politician and economist, candidate in the 2018 presidential election
- Felipe Gómez Mont, criminal lawyer and politician, co-founder of the National Action Party; lived on Calle Lombardo Toledano
- Augusto Monterroso (1921–2003), writer; died at his home in Chimalistac
- Augusto Gómez Villanueva (born 1929), diplomat and politician
- Elena Poniatowska (born 1932), writer, journalist and activist
- Julio Camelo Martínez
- Arturo "el Rudo" Rivera (1954–2022), sportscaster and radio host; born at Calle Santa 16

== Points of interest ==
- Parish church of San Sebastián Mártir
- Plaza Federico Gamboa
- Cámara de los secretos or Ermita del Secreto
- Obraje Posadas, a former textile workshop founded in the late 16th or early 17th century by Melchor Díez de Posadas
- Puente del Púlpito
- Monument to Álvaro Obregón and Parque de la Bombilla
- Carso Center for the Study of Mexican History
- Casa Gálvez
- Casa de la Universidad de California en México
- Club España

== Gallery ==
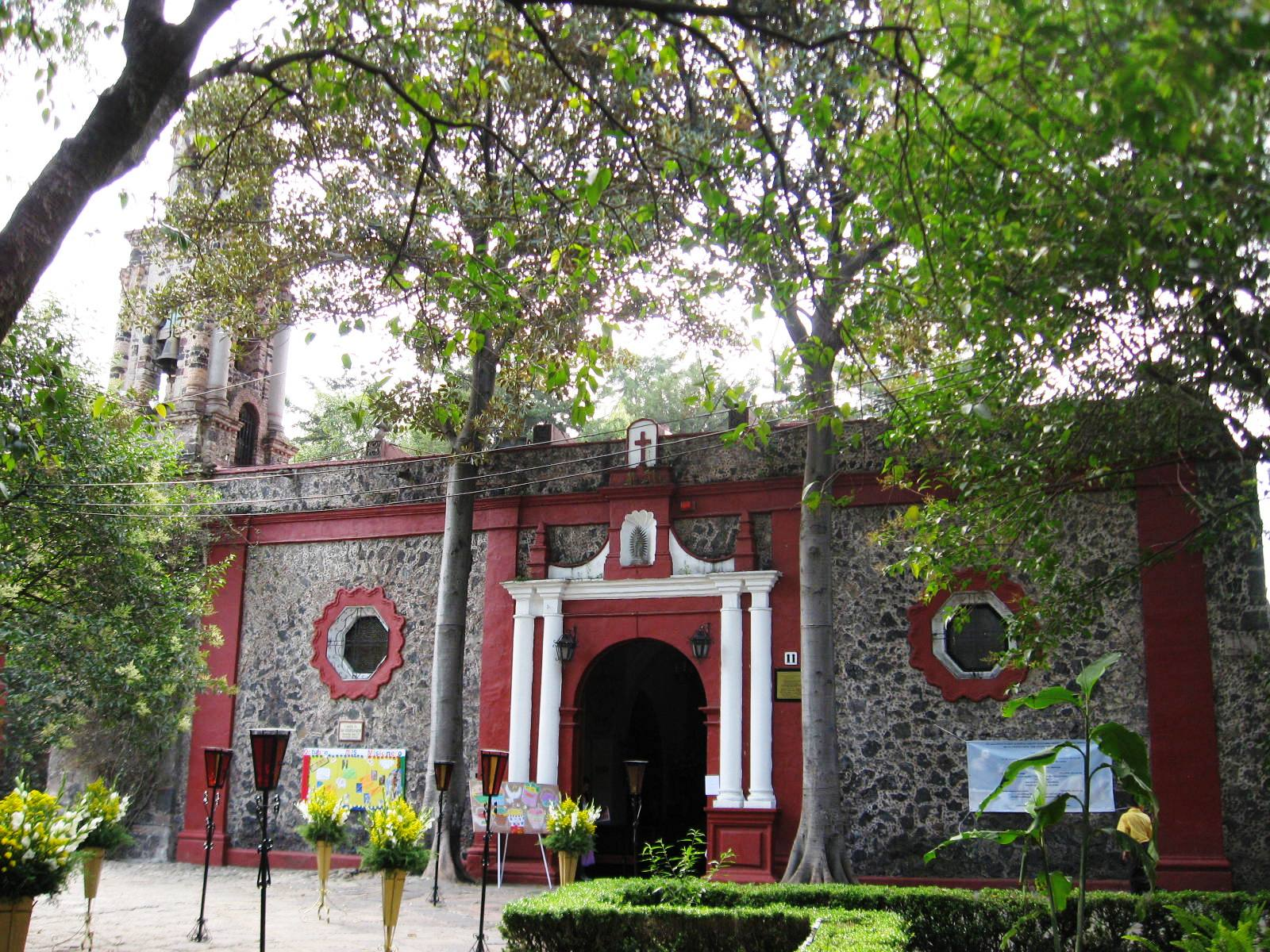
Parish church of San Sebastián Mártir

Cámara de los secretos

Interior of the Cámara de los secretos

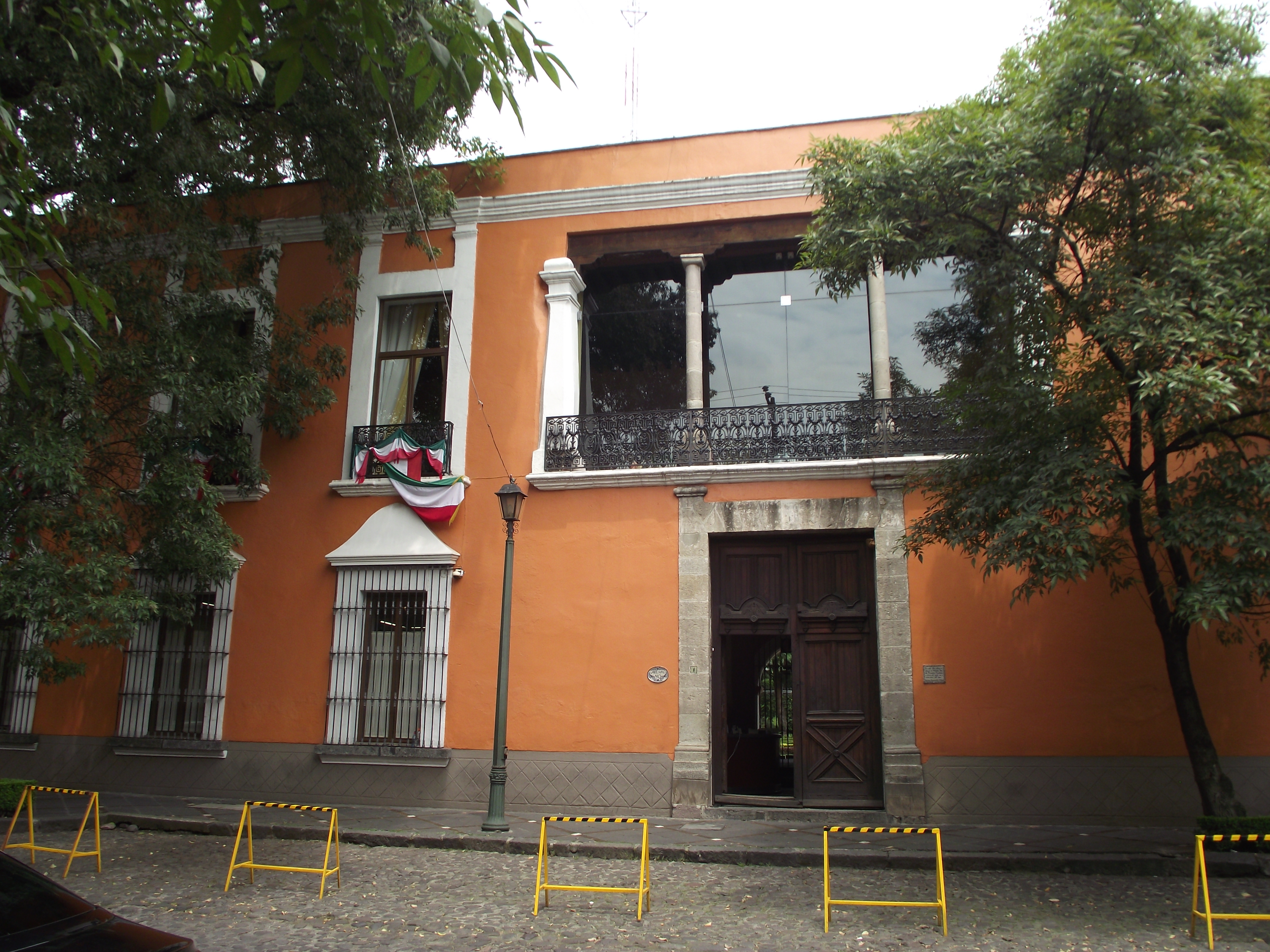
Obraje Posadas

Puente del Púlpito

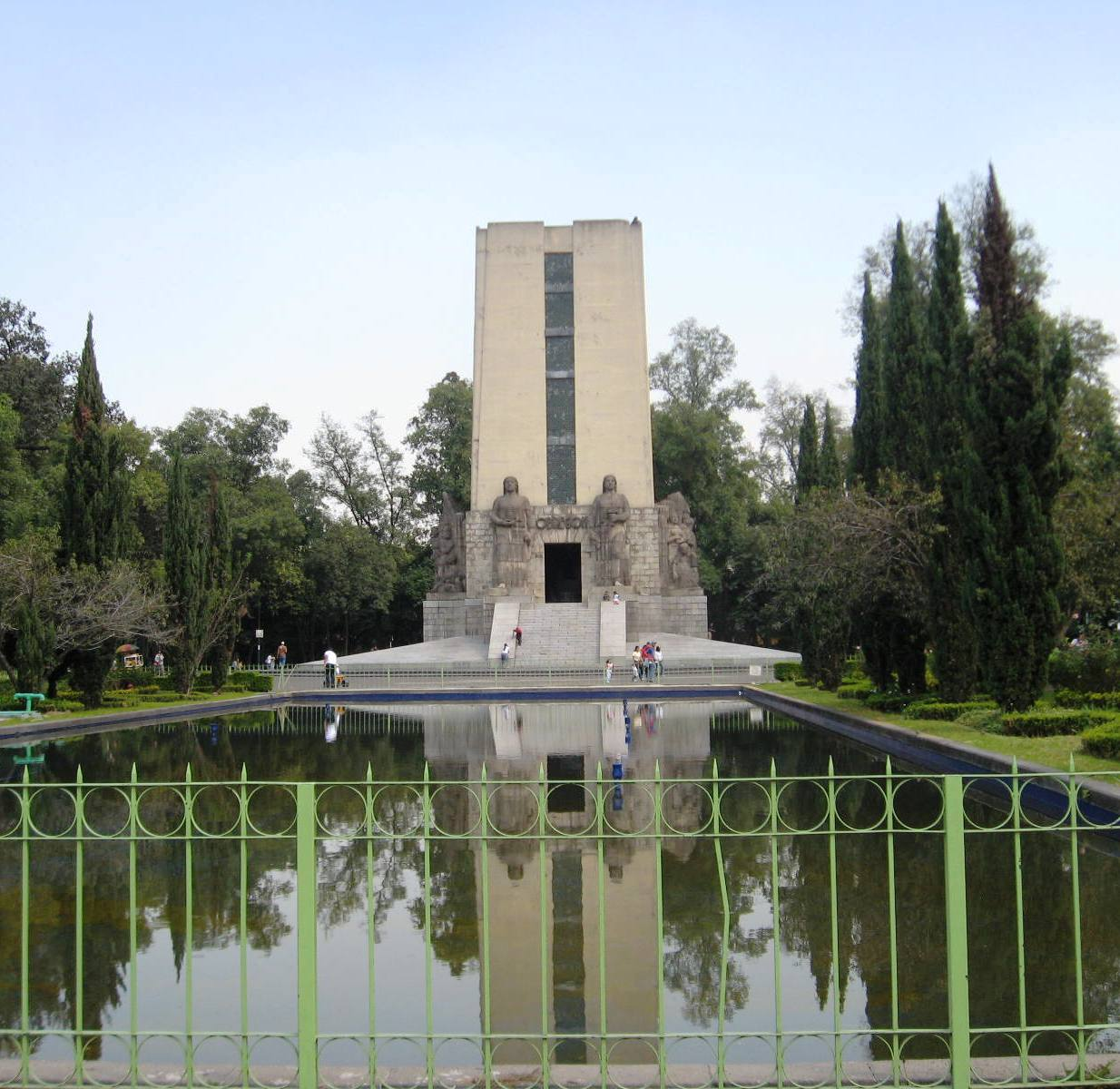
Monument to Álvaro Obregón
