= Chilpancingo metro station =

Mexico City metro station

Chilpancingo
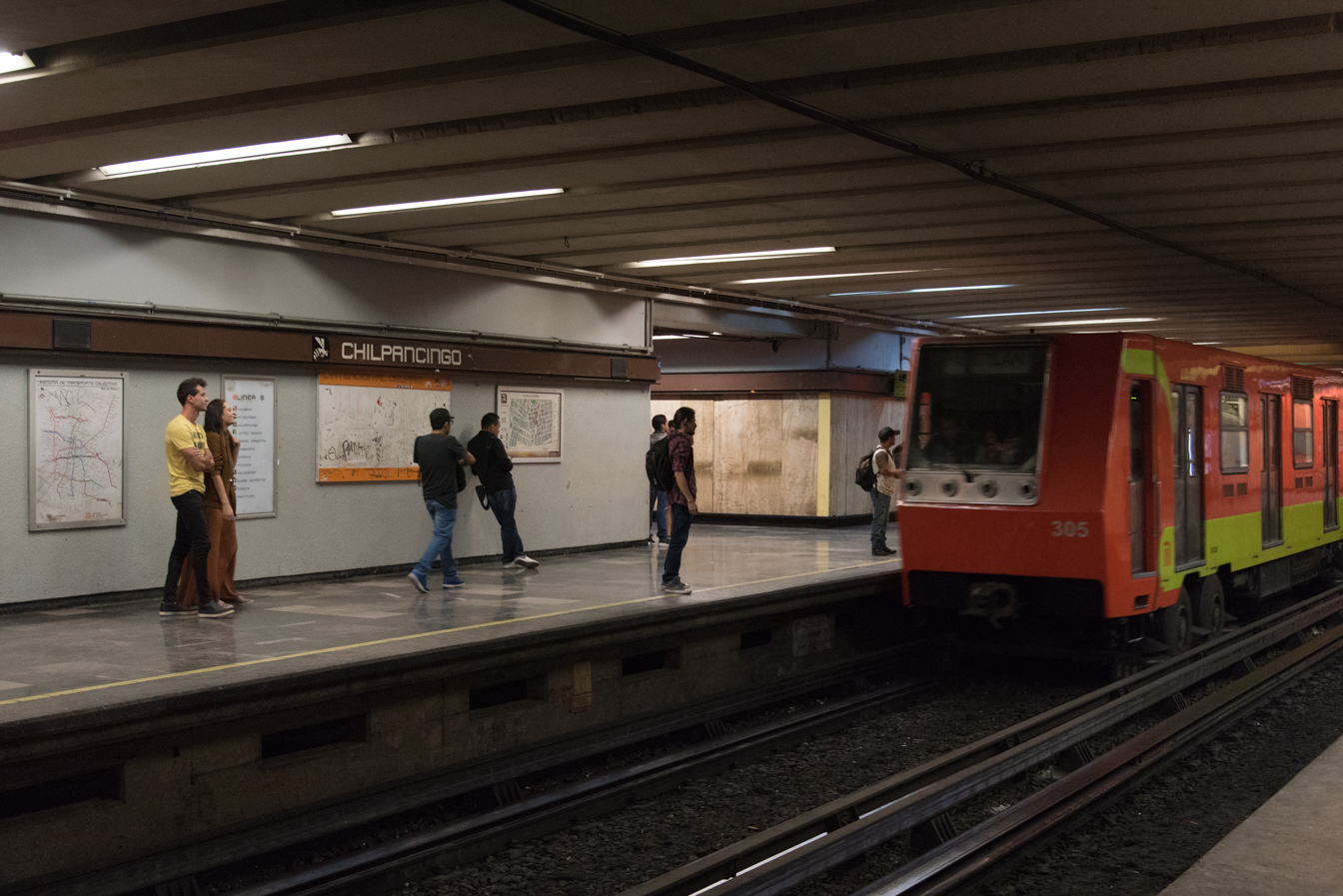
- Station as of September 2018

General information
- Location: Cuauhtémoc, Mexico City; Mexico
- Coordinates: 19.4059°N 99.1686°W
- System: Mexico City Metro
- Platforms: 2 side platforms
- Tracks: 2
- Connections: Chilpancingo

Construction
- Structure type: Underground

Other information
- Status: In service

History
- Opened: 29 August 1988; 38 years ago

Passengers
- 2025: 13,386,721 (Note: The data here is limited to the most recent ten years to avoid excessive listings; earlier figures can be found in this page's history or on the Mexico City Metro website. To calculate the average daily ridership, the annual total is divided by 365 days (366 in leap years), with decimals omitted from the result. Each station per line is ranked individually, as the system counts transfer stations separately. The percentage change is calculated automatically using the data from the current year and the previous year.) ▲4.93%
- Rank: 13/195

Services
Preceding station	Mexico City Metro	Following station
Patriotismo toward Tacubaya	Line 9	Centro Médico toward Pantitlán
Route map
Location
- Location within Mexico City
- Area map

Chilpancingo (Spanish: Estación Chilpancingo) is an underground metro station along Line 9 of the Mexico City Metro. It is located in the Cuauhtémoc borough of Mexico City. It is very close to the Metrobús station of the same name. In 2019, the station had an average ridership of 49,122 passengers per day, making it the busiest station in Line 9 and the 17th busiest station in the network.

== General information ==
The station is named after the nearby Avenida Chilpancingo, which in turn is named after the city of Chilpancingo de los Bravo, the capital of the state of Guerrero. The station logo is the silhouette of a wasp since Chilpancingo means the place of the wasps in Nahuatl. When Line 9 was in planning stage, the name of the station was Condesa, due to the neighborhood it serves, but it was finally changed to Chilpancingo.

The station serves the Colonia Roma Sur and Colonia Condesa neighbourhoods in the Cuauhtémoc borough. It is located at the intersection of Avenida de los Insurgentes and Avenida Baja California. It was opened on 29 August 1988.

In July 2007 a man in his 70s died of a heart attack within the station.

=== Ridership ===
Annual passenger ridership
Year	Ridership	Average daily	Rank	% change	Ref.
2025	13,386,721	36,675	13/195	+4.93%
2024	12,757,437	34,856	14/195	+1.45%
2023	12,575,125	34,452	14/195	+0.87%
2022	12,466,630	34,155	15/195	+32.20%
2021	9,430,276	25,836	16/195	+6.05%
2020	8,892,218	24,295	20/195	−41.55%
2019	15,212,533	41,678	22/195	+1.93%
2018	14,924,903	40,890	21/195	−3.99%
2017	15,544,376	42,587	18/195	−3.21%
2016	16,059,326	43,877	19/195	−0.90%
