= Ecobici (Mexico City) =

Mexico City bicycle-share program

Ecobici logo

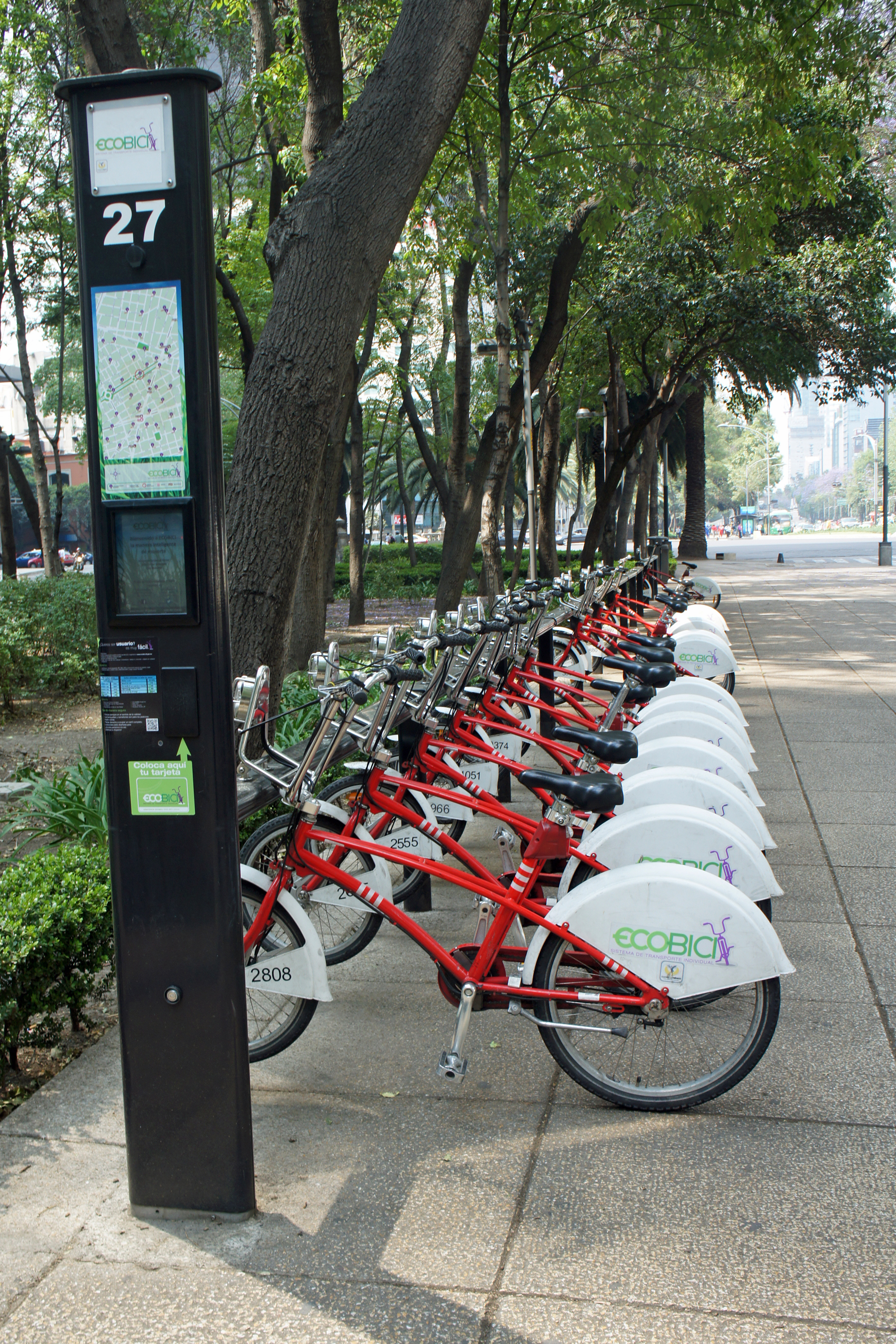
Ecobici rental station at Paseo de la Reforma

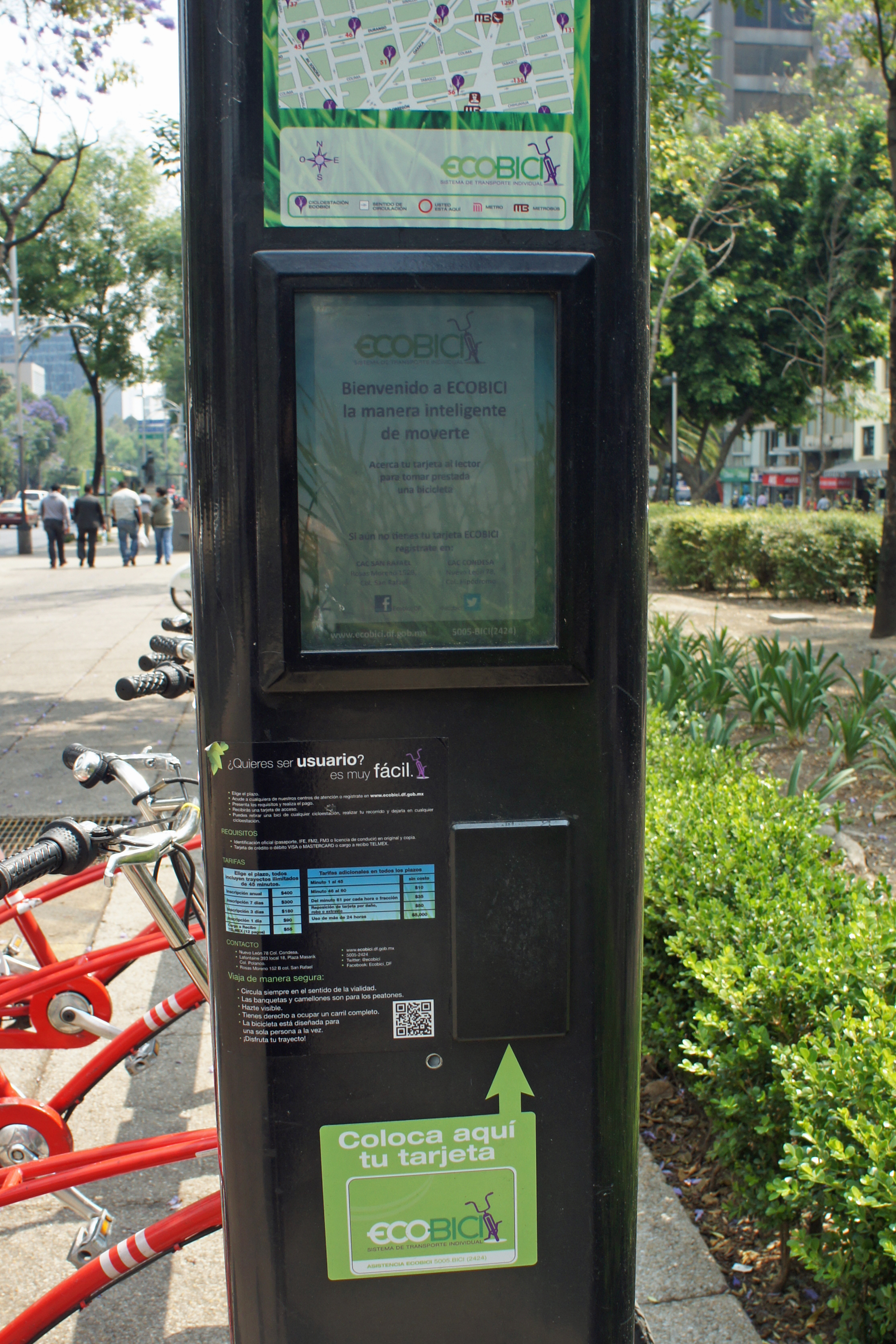
Ecobici payment kiosk at rental station

Ecobici is the bicycle sharing system launched in February 2010 by the government of Mexico City. Initially launched with 85 docking stations and 1,000 distinctive red and white liveried bicycles, the network then expanded by September 2013 to be at 276 stations with 4,000 bicycles, and as of August 2024, now has 689 stations with 9,300 bicycles.

== History ==
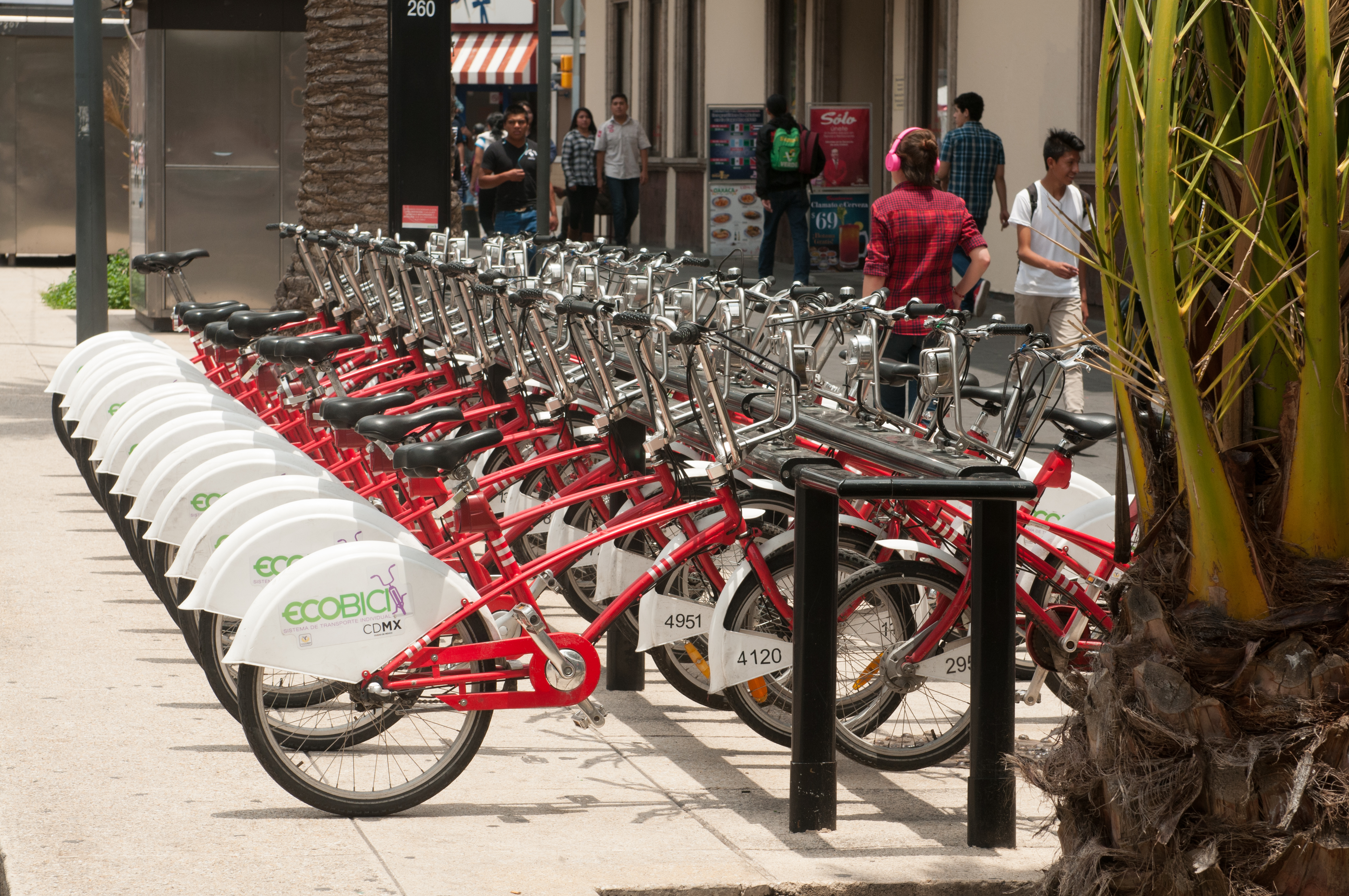
Ecobici bicycles at a docking station

Video of biking in Mexico City and using Ecobici.

From September through December 2012, the system area expanded from 6.8 to 21 square kilometres (2.6 to 8.1 sq mi), which would bring the estimated number of users from 30,000 in September 2012 to 100,000. And indeed, statistics from August 2013 showed 95,780 members registered; daily ridership averaged 25,000, versus 14,000 in December 2012; monthly ridership averaged 400,000.

By October 2013, the system covered the areas:

- Historic center (Centro Histórico)
- part of Colonia Guerrero
- Colonia Tabacalera
- Colonia San Rafael
- Colonia Cuauhtémoc
- Colonia Juárez including the Zona Rosa
- Colonia Roma Norte and Colonia Roma Sur
- Condesa
- San Miguel Chapultepec
- Escandón
- Anzures
- Polanco

In February 2014 it was announced that the system would be extended (Phase IV) with 2600 additional cycles and 170 new stations in the Benito Juárez borough, in the area bordered by Viaducto, Avenida Cuauhtémoc, Circuito Interior and Avenida Revolución, covering the colonias:

- Acacias
- Ciudad de los Deportes
- Del Valle Centro, Norte, and Sur
- Extremadura Insurgentes
- Noche Buena
- Nápoles
- Narvarte
- San Pedro de los Pinos
- Xoco

== Operation ==
The system is run by a private company, Clear Channel Outdoor, but funded by the government with an initial investment of 75 million pesos (US$5,750,000). Users of the system are required to purchase an RFID card at a cost of 545 pesos (US$26.55) which will provide them with access to the bicycles for one year. For tourists, a 7-day card can be obtained for 409 pesos, a 3-day card for 245 pesos, and a single day card for 123 pesos. A smart phone app is also available that uses a QR code scan to rent the bikes. The app is created and managed by Lyft. Use of a bicycle is free for the first 45 minutes; extra charges are applied for use beyond this time limit.

The registration process has been simplified considerably but this is not well known. Updated Ecobici station readers have a credit card slot at the bottom. You can register and pay (with any credit card) very simply by answering a few questions on the screen - no ID required, no passports, no forms to sign. Once you register on the screen, you are given a registration number and you put in your own PIN code. You can then get a bike at any station just using that registration number and PIN.
