= Colonia Nápoles =

Nápoles
- Neighborhood of Mexico City
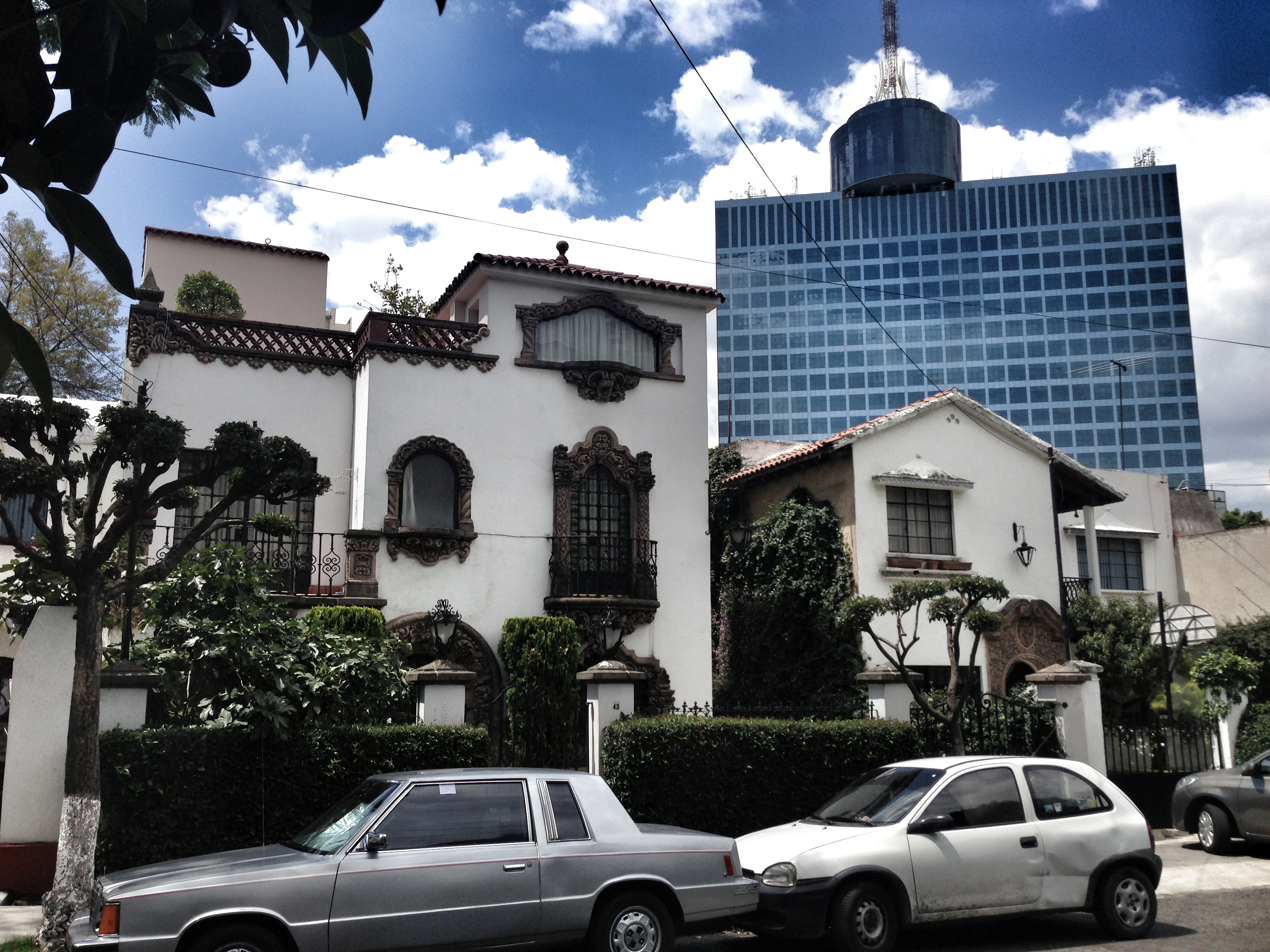
- Colonial California house and World Trade Center in colonia Nápoles

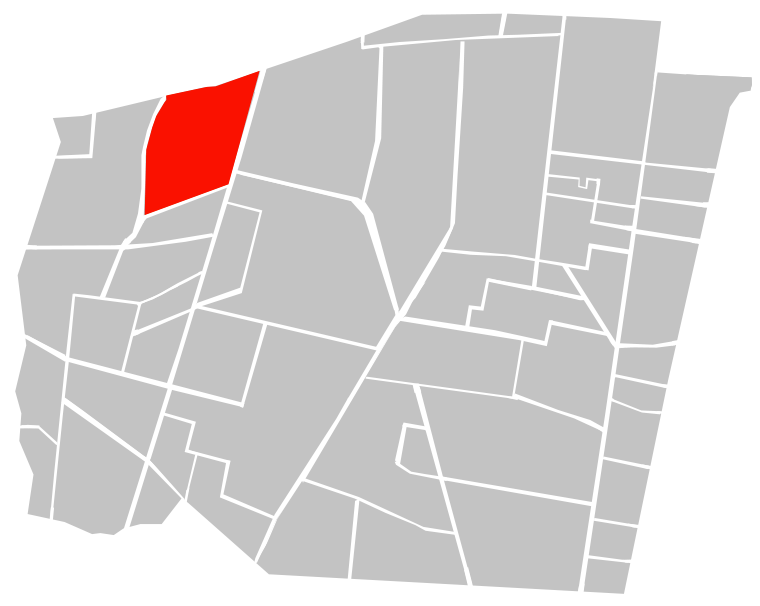
- Location of Colonia Nápoles (in red) within Benito Juárez borough
- Coordinates: 19.3943°N 99.1771°W
- Country: Mexico
- City: Mexico City
- Borough: Benito Juárez

Area
  - Total: 0.976 km^{2} (0.377 sq mi)

Population (2015)
  - Total: 12,106
- Postal code: 03810

Colonia Nápoles is a colonia in Benito Juárez, Mexico City in the North central area of the metropolis. Along with Colonia Del Valle, it's among the most representative of Mid-Century neighborhoods of Mexico City.

== Location ==
It is bordered by:

- Viaducto Río Becerra and colonia San Pedro de los Pinos on the west
- Viaducto Río Becerra and Viaducto Miguel Alemán, and colonia Escandón on the north
- Avenida de los Insurgentes and Colonia del Valle on the east
- on the south, colonia Ampliación Nápoles stretches from Calle Georgia to Eje 5 Sur San Antonio; across San Antonio is colonia Ciudad de los Deportes.

== Description ==
Landmarks include the World Trade Center complex with offices, restaurants, cinemas and shopping, and the Polyforum Cultural Siqueiros, a performing arts center designed and painted by David Alfaro Siqueiros one of the most important muralists and painter in Mexico.

One of the original developments here in the late 1930s was Parque de la Lama, designed by Raúl Basurto, one of the principal architects of many of the new residential areas in Polanco, Colonia del Valle, Roma, Condesa and others. The neighborhood was one of the most important spots for new modern architects as Vladimir Kaspé or young Pedro Ramírez Vázquez new buildings. Also in a section of the neighborhoods, in the 1940s, the covenant required buyers to build single-family houses in a historic style called "Colonial California", (a Mexican term for the California style of Spanish Colonial Revival architecture). Many houses of this style can still be seen in Nápoles. Sample of the architecture in Mid-century modern style, is the house designed in 1946 for the recognized architect Vladimir Kaspé in the corner of the streets of Dakota and Nueva Jersey. La Nápoles and La del Valle are the most iconic mid-century neighborhoods in the city. More recently, contemporary apartment buildings have been built as infill, some by Javier Sánchez.

The neighborhood has the Parque Alameda Nápoles (Alfonso Esparza Oteo), a 22,593-square-metre (5.6-acre) park.

== Transportation ==
=== Public transportation ===
The area is served by the Mexico City Metrobús and EcoBici bikeshare.

Metrobus stations

- Nápoles
- Poliforum
- La Piedad

== Gallery ==
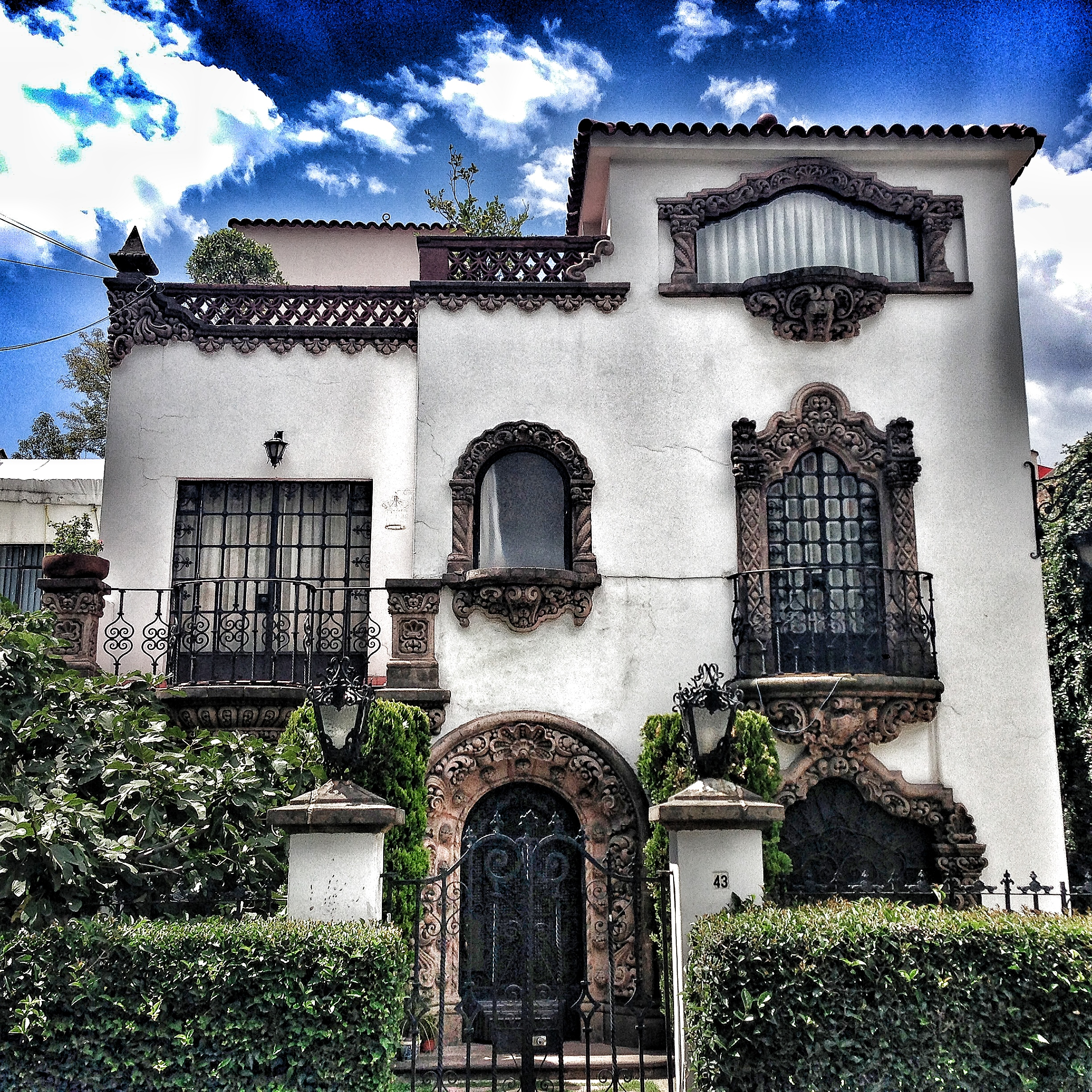
Colonial California house in colonia Nápoles

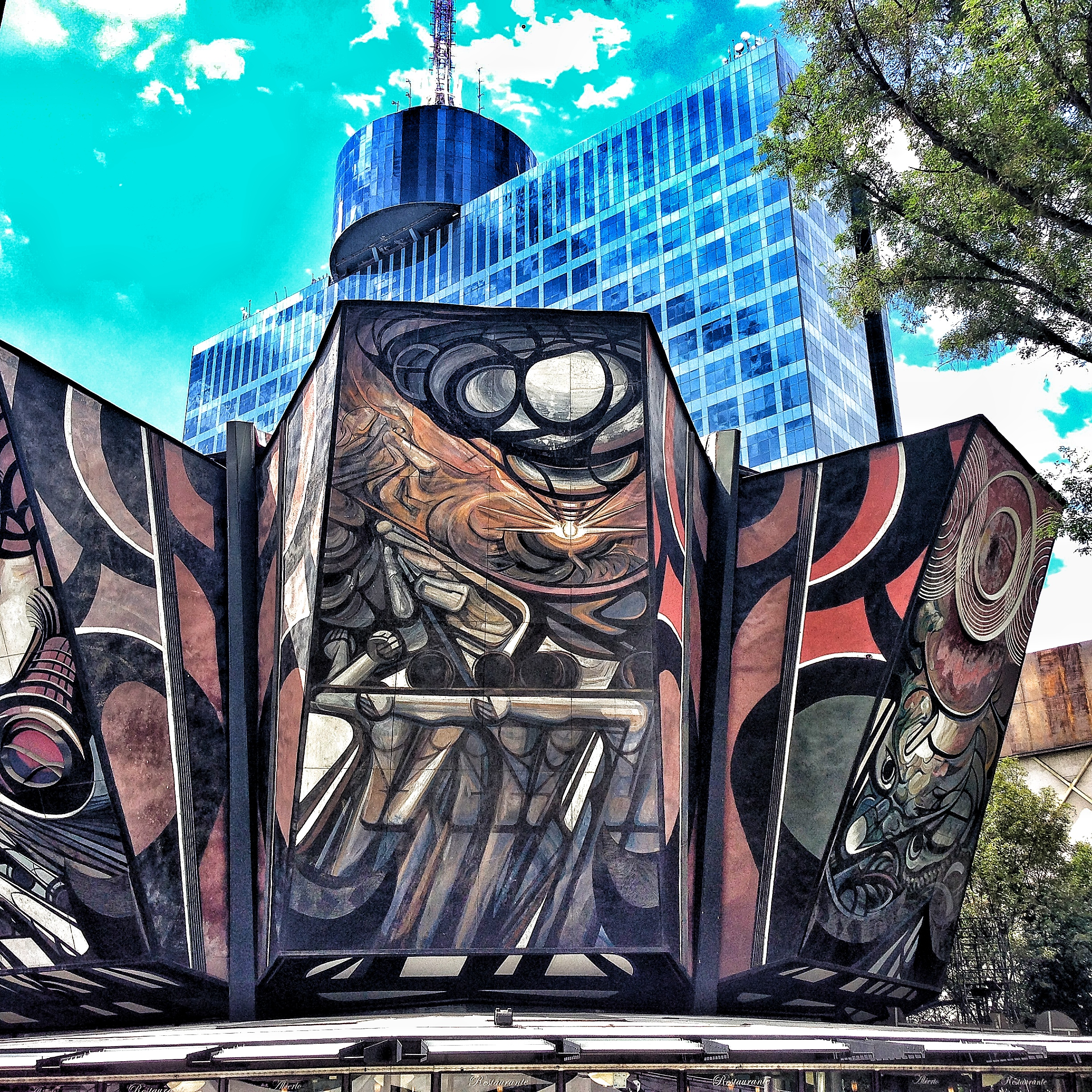
Polyforum Cultural Siqueiros and WTC in background

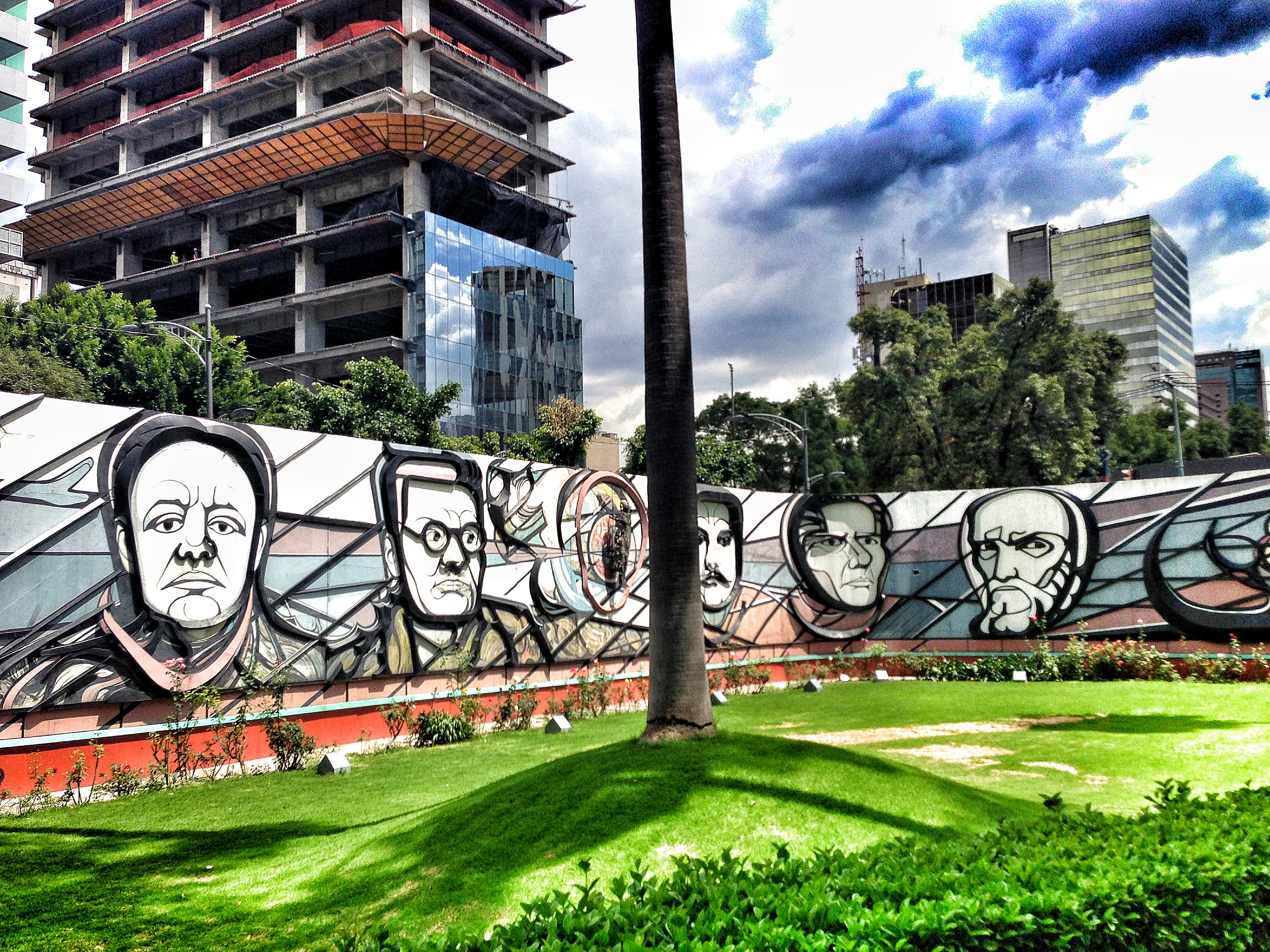
Polyforum Cultural Siqueiros portraits of Mexican muralists

== See also ==
- Barrios Mágicos
