= Viaducto Miguel Alemán =

Highway in Mexico

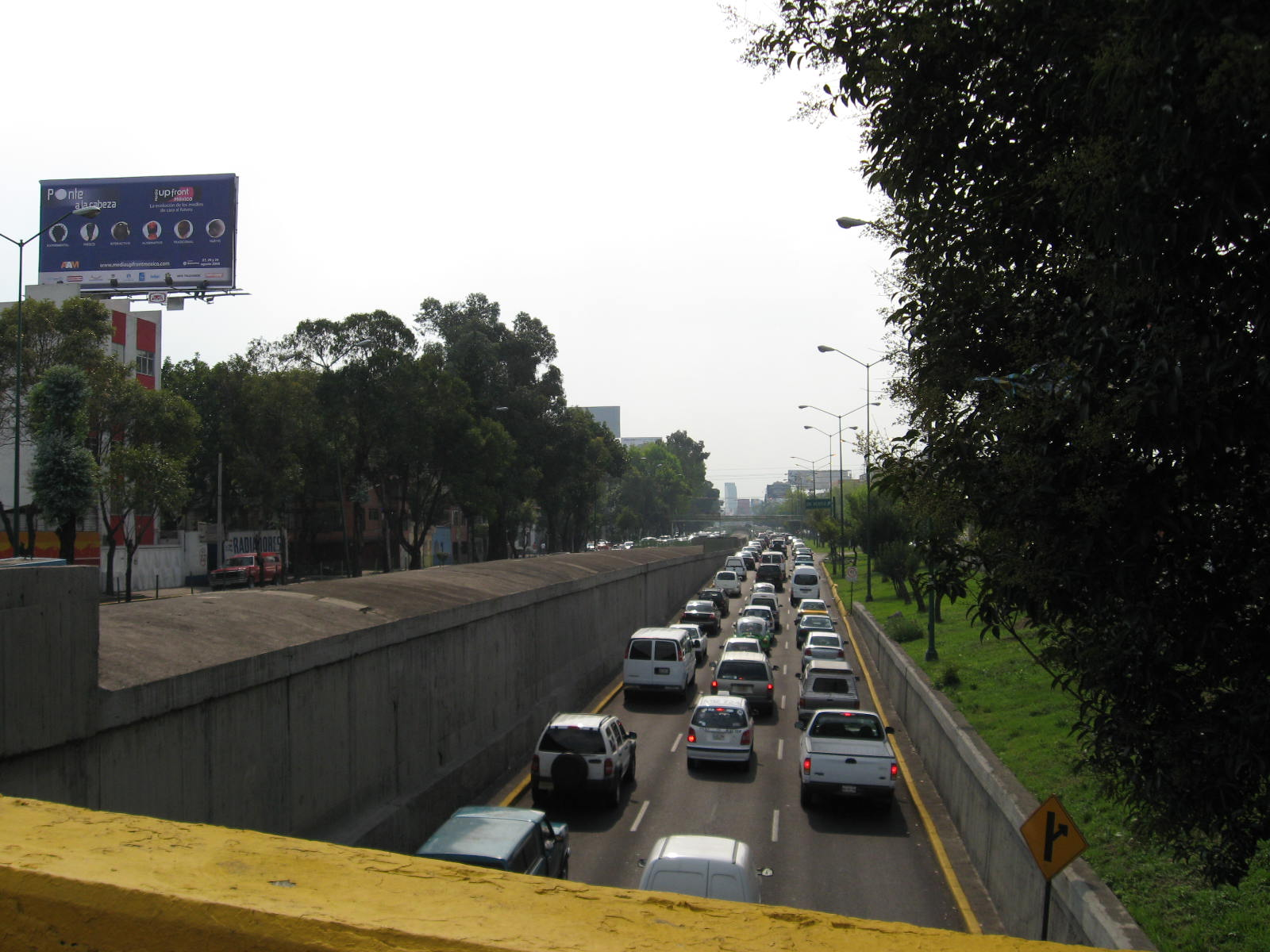
Viaducto Miguel Alemán taken from the Eje Central bridge at about 5 pm on a Monday afternoon. In the center is the water tunnel.

Viaducto Miguel Alemán is a crosstown freeway, opened in September 1950, that runs east-west across central Mexico City. In the center of the road is a river encased in cement to control flooding. Metro Viaducto is named after this road.

The encased duct that is contained at the center of the freeway carries water from the west-city hillsides, specifically from the Tacubaya and Becerra rivers. At the east end of the freeway, the river discharges its waters into the Churubusco River, also enclosed.

The Viaducto Miguel Alemán is nomenclature-wise divided in three sections:

- Viaducto Río de la Piedad, from its east-side end at Calzada Ignacio Zaragoza in the Pantitlán zone to the Calzada de Tlalpan junction. Carries the Piedad River.
- Viaducto Miguel Alemán, from the Calzada de Tlalpan junction to its west end at the junction with the Anillo Periférico beltway. Carries the Tacubaya and Piedad rivers. In the first stage of operation, the freeway comprised only the portion between Parque Lira and Cuauhtémoc avenues.
- Viaducto Río Becerra a western branch that connects the encased portion of the Becerra River from the Patriotismo and San Antonio Avenues junction to its join with the Tacubaya River to compose the Piedad River.

The Viaducto was originally planned by architect Carlos Contreras as early as 1925, together with other major roads such as the Anillo Periférico.

== See also ==
- Miguel Alemán – a list of namesakes
