= Netotiliztli =

Tradition of dance in Indigenous Mexico

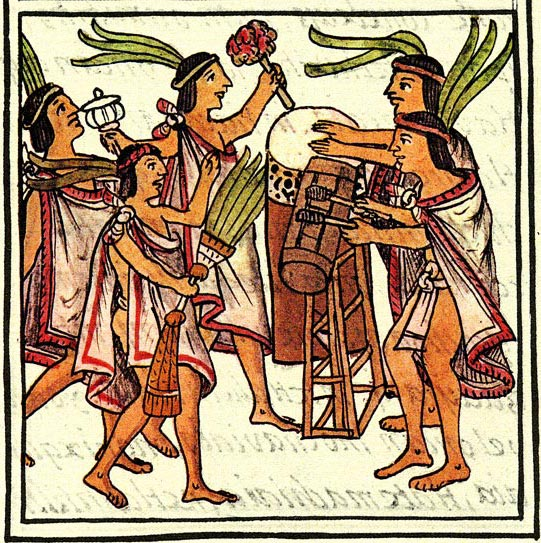
- Illustration of a dance ceremony, taken from the 16th-century Florentine Codex. The instruments depicted to the front are teponatzli, with huehuetls visible in the background.

Related ethnic groups
- Nahua Mexica Indigenous people of the Americas

Netotiliztli, often known as the dance of celebration and worship, was a traditional dance practiced by the Mexica people.

== Context ==
=== Background ===
Netotiliztli was practiced by the Mexica, a Nahuatl-speaking population that resided on an island in Lake Texcoco, in the valley of Mexico. Their capital, Tenochtitlan, wielded immense social and political power, while boasting as many as 200 000 citizens. Tenochtitlan was altepetl, or "city-state", meaning it had its own emperor, territory and jurisdiction. Altepetls were divided into smaller units, called calpulli, that represented certain neighbourhoods within the city. The heart of Tenochtitlan was the sacred precinct, which included the Great Temple, a ball court, a school, libraries and residences for priests. Much of Mexica life revolved around this precinct, as it housed sacrifices, ceremonies and education, which were pillars of Mexica life.

=== Social organization ===
Mexica social organization mirrored that of their city, as it was divided into many segments of varied importance and function. The emperor, known as the Tlatoani, possessed ultimate power; beneath him fell all other nobles, commoners and slaves. His duties included land distribution, and overseeing temples, markets and warfare. Further differentiation occurred between men and women, as Mexica society was androcentric- men held employment as priests, warriors, artisans and farmers, while women led domestic lives as mothers and housekeepers. This gendered divide was emphasized by the education system in Tenochtitlan; boys were taught how to be priests, government administrators and warriors, while girls learned domestic skills from their mothers. That being said, all children learned the art of dance and music, as these were fundamental elements of Mexica culture.

=== Spirituality ===
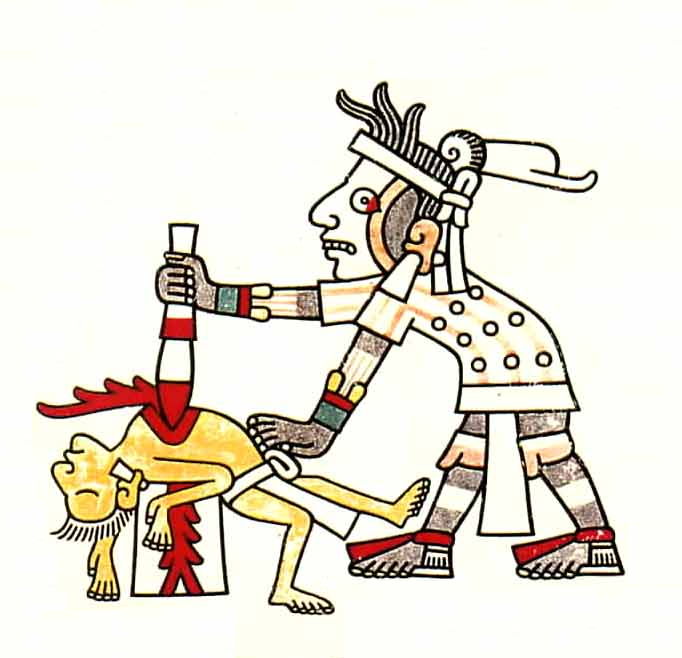
Aztec ritual sacrifice, depicted in Codex Laud

Cosmological beliefs were the ethos of Mexica religion. The Mexica believed their gods sacrificed themselves to create life, by throwing themselves into a pit of fire to birth the sun, or by shedding their celestial blood to create humans. This mythology prompted a theme of reciprocity amongst the Mexica, one woven deep into the cloth of their religion.

To pay the debt owed to their creators, the Mexica honored their gods with lavish temples, where sculptures of each god were housed. Rituals were performed at these temples, such as blood-letting, auto-sacrifice and human sacrifice. These rituals were the pinnacle of Mexica devotion, as they repaid their gods with the greatest gift of all- human blood- the very essence of life.

== Description ==
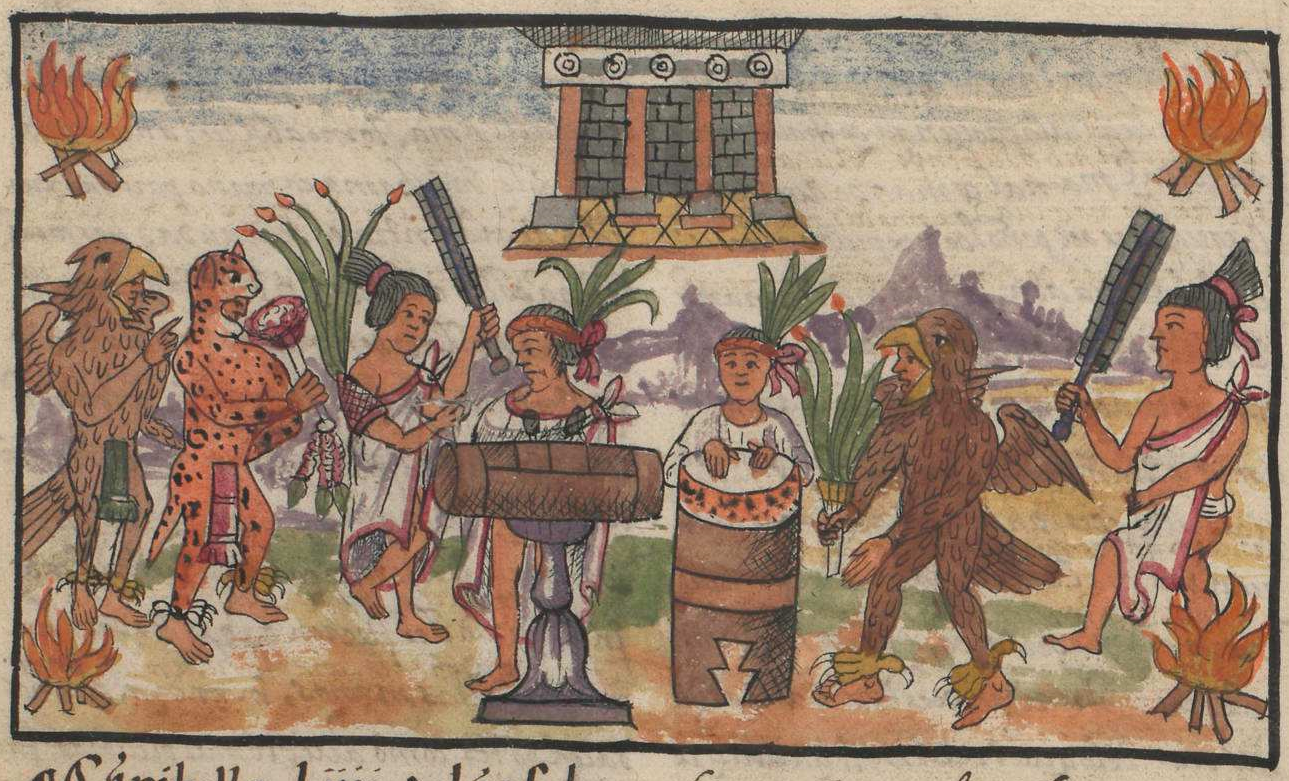
Celebrations held for the coronation of emperor Moctezuma II of Mexico in the Durán Codex.

Before and after the Nahuas and Spaniards met between 1500-1800s, the Nahua are free to dance in their ceremonies and summon their gods and ancestors through dances. This included Netotiliztli, which had symbolic, spiritual choreography.

Netotiliztli, which loosely translates to "expressed by dance," was a communicative dance of worship and rejoice practiced by the Mexica. It was performed by dancers, who could be any member of society, as all members of Nahua society were educated in song and dance. Netotiliztli was also not associated with a particular location, and could be practiced in public in temples, or in private settings. The dances could occur at any time, although celebrations often aligned with the agricultural season, as festivals and ceremonies marked the beginning of the agriculture season to ensure a plentiful harvest.

There were certain dances for men and women, though some dances incorporated both genders to symbolize balance, which was a common theme in Aztec religion. Women could have sacred roles as "sahumadora" or "smoke women," who were tasked with burning incense throughout the ceremony. They were centric to the spiritual energy of the dance and enabling contact with the gods.

=== Spiritual Importance ===
Netotiliztli reflected the cosmological beliefs intertwined in Mexica religion. Their greatest gift from the gods- the sun- paramount to life and agriculture, oriented their movements. Just as the planets orbit the sun, dancers would position themselves in a circle and dance around a pit of fire. Drums were also placed at the centre of this circle, to emulate the heartbeat of the world. Participants in this dance would shake their body (head, arms, and feet) to show their gods that they were available to serve them. Mexica dancers also routinely imitated animals, or elements of the natural world-such as lightening or rolling clouds- to pray for rain. The gods controlled all aspects of existence, from natural disasters to fertility; therefore, the Mexica danced to appease the gods and assure prosperity and blessings.

=== Regalia ===
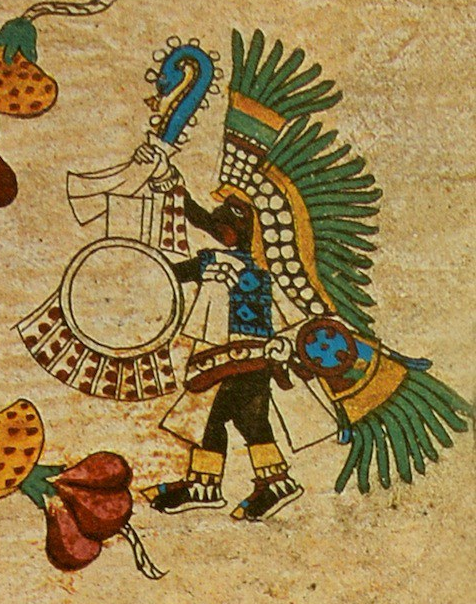
Dancer in the Codex Borbonicus.

During these rituals, dancers wore distinctive regalia, including jewelry, patterned capes, loin-cloths, and feathered headdresses. Their regalia incorporated animal qualities, to mimic their deities and honour animals with symbolic importance within Mexica culture. For example, the Mexica often worshiped Quetzalcoatl, a feathered-serpent god of war and agriculture, by wearing feathers and dancing in snake-like movements. They also believed snakes- who shed their skin- symbolized fertility and rebirth. To continue, Netotiliztli regalia incorporated the colour red, which represented happiness and protection. Dancers donned red sashes around their heads and waists; they believed this would cleanse their thoughts and prayers, and shield unwanted energy from entering their body as they danced.

=== Music and Instruments ===
"Cantares Mexicanos" , a book that describes all standard dances and songs, asserts that Netotiliztli was not composed only of movements, but it was accompanied by a large bass drum and ghost songs. The dance was also accompanied by earthly sounds that emulated rain, birds, or whirling wind, allowing the dancers to shake and incorporate all the senses of their body. Common examples of instruments used to replicate these natural sounds are huēhuētls (drums), teponaztli (a marimba-type drum), flutes, and seed pods worn around dancers’ ankles, known as ayoyotes.

Some believe that this dance was the representation of elder's sacred advice combined with ritual spells allowing the spirits to incarnate the bodies of the people who were dancing. Thus, this dance became an important representation for both Indigenous and Mestizo communities.

== The Survival of Netotiliztli After the Spanish Conquest ==
During the Spanish Conquest, Christianity was imposed on the Nahua people, which prohibited many traditions and celebrations linked to Aztec gods, including Netotiliztli.

Netotiliztli survived because the Nahua shifted the dance's meaning from a spiritual tradition of celebration and worship, to a dance solely for pleasure. They also incorporated Christian rituals; allowing anyone- including both the Nahua and Spaniards- to participate. This blending of rituals elucidates the religious syncretism that existed between the Nahua and Spaniards after the Spanish Conquest, which allowed traditions like Netotiliztli to continue.

== Netotiliztli Today ==
While Netotiliztli evolved to survive the integration of Spanish and Christian beliefs into Nahua society, it is no longer celebrated in the realm of Mexica dance traditions. With that being said, many Aztec dances are still central to communities in Mexico, and are incorporated into various festivals throughout the year.

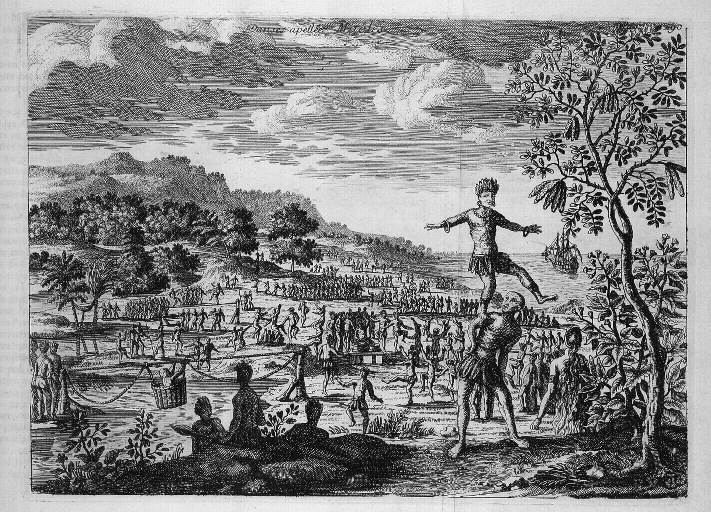
Representation of Indigenous dance in Mexico

Dances:

- Jarabe tapatío
- Deer Dance
- Concheros
- Voladores
- Ballet Folkorico
