= Concheros =

Traditional dance and ceremony in Mexico

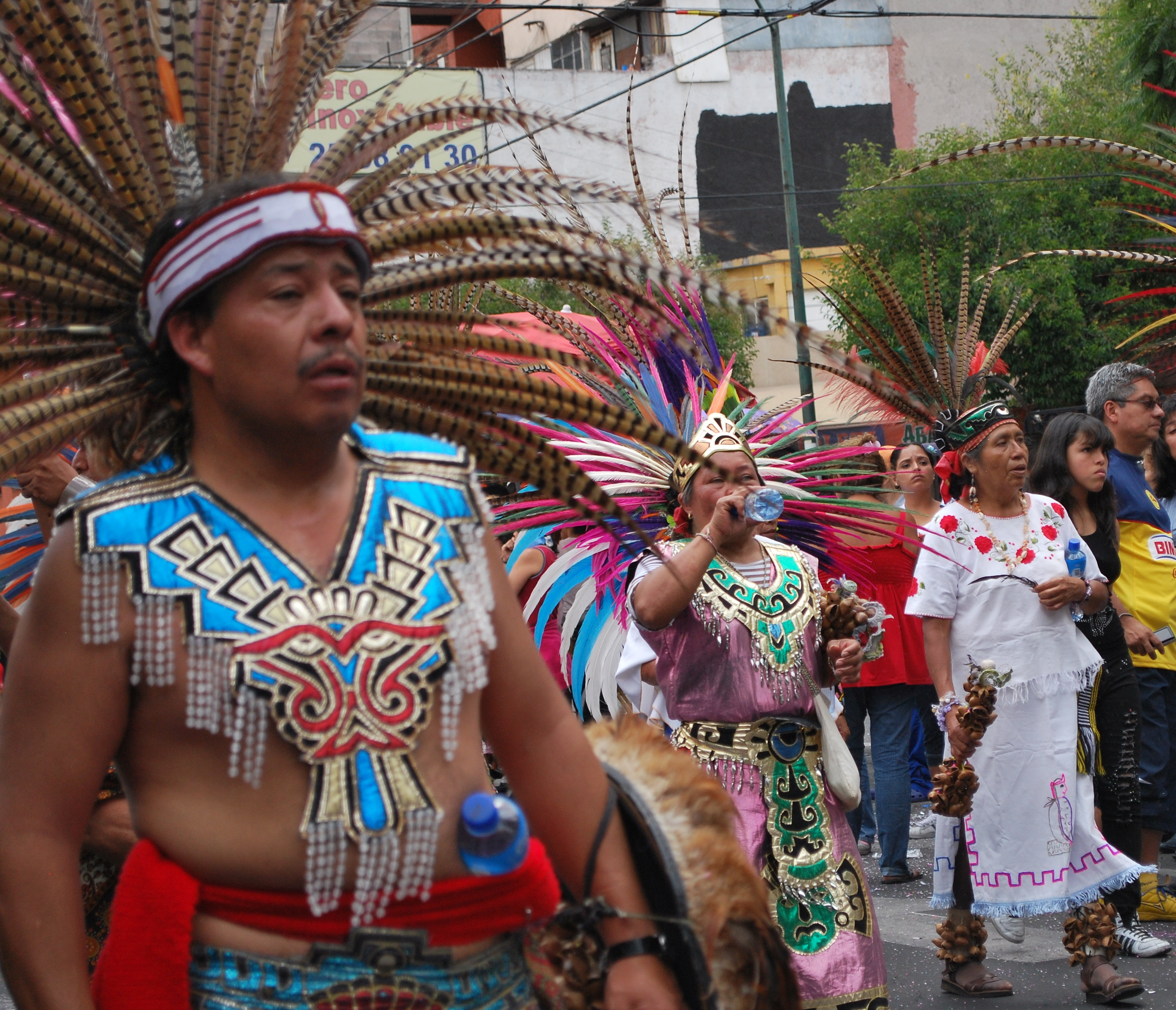
Conchero dancers in Colonia Doctores, Mexico City

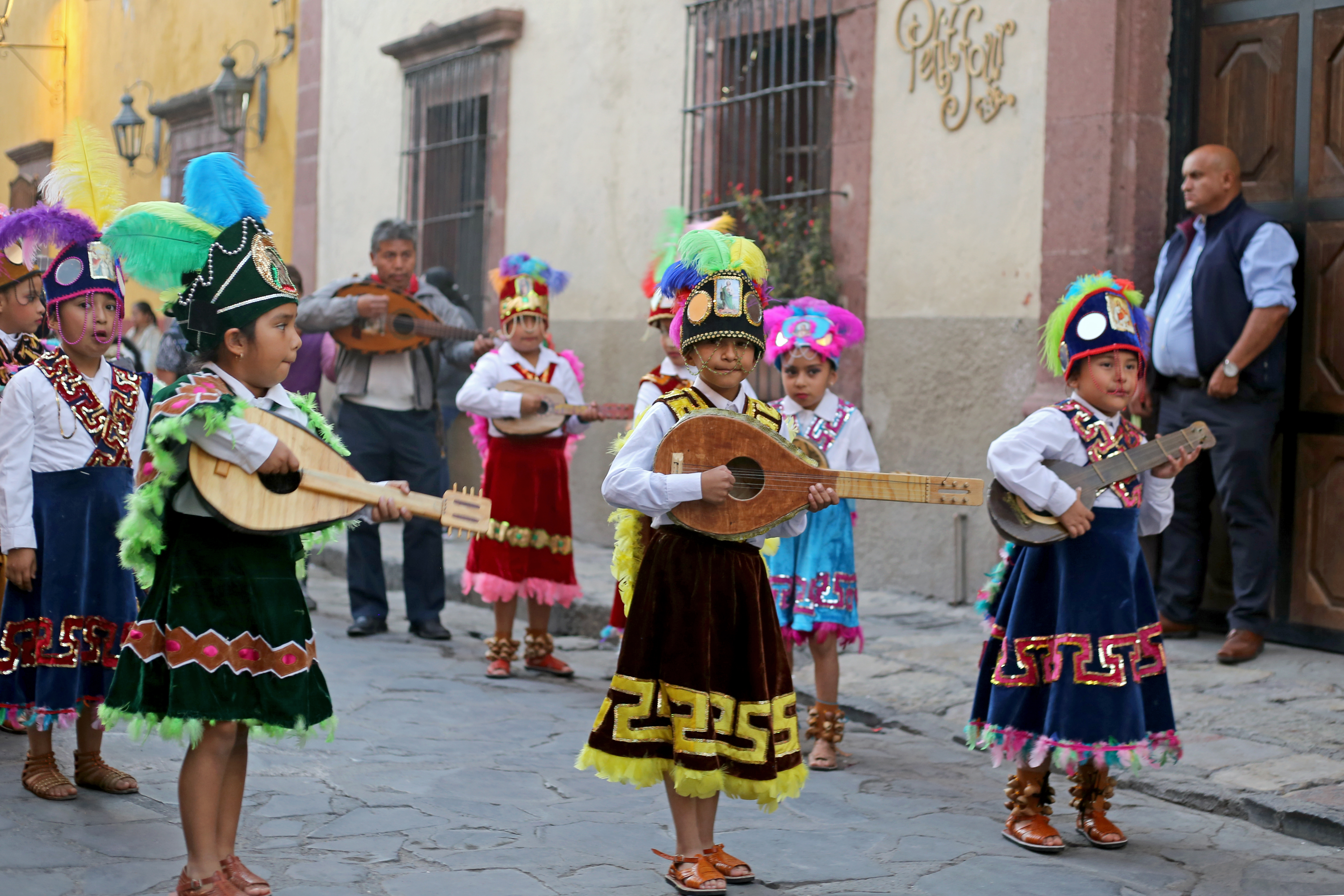
Children performing Concheros in Mexico

The Concheros dance, also known as the dance of the Chichimecas, Aztecas and Mexicas, is an important traditional dance and ceremony which has been performed in Mexico since early in the colonial period. It presents syncretic features both pre-Hispanic and Christian. The dance has strong visual markers of its pre-Hispanic roots with feathered regalia, indigenous dance steps and indigenous instruments such as drums. However, the name Concheros comes from a type of lute made with an armadillo shell, showing Spanish influence. The dance in its current form was the adaptation of the old "mitote" dance to Catholicism as a means of preserving some aspects of indigenous rite. It remained a purely religious ceremony until the mid 20th century when political and social changes in Mexico also gave it cultural significance as a folk dance. Since the later 20th century, a sub group of the dance called Mexicas has emerged with the aim of eliminating the European influence, often with political aims. This form of the dance migrated to the United States in the mid-1970s and can be seen in states such as California in Mexican American communities.

Although the dance tradition has been known (especially in the U.S.) as "Aztec" or "Mexica," it is not indigenous to them in any way. The roots of the conchero dances (and thus the roots of the modern "Mexica" dances tradition) is deeply rooted in the Chichimeca cultures of the north. The Otomi, Jonaz, Chichimeca, Caxcan, and other tribes never conquered by the Mexica, are the true roots of the Danza Conchera. Whereas the Mexi'ca rituals were based on solar concepts and values, the Chichimeca were rooted in selenic and stellar cosmology. Worship and honoring of family and cultural ancestors was a large part of the Chichimeca tradition. That is why today's conchero rituals always start at midnight, and include rituals to call "down" the spirits of the ancestors to bring purity for the following day's battle (dance ritual).

== History ==
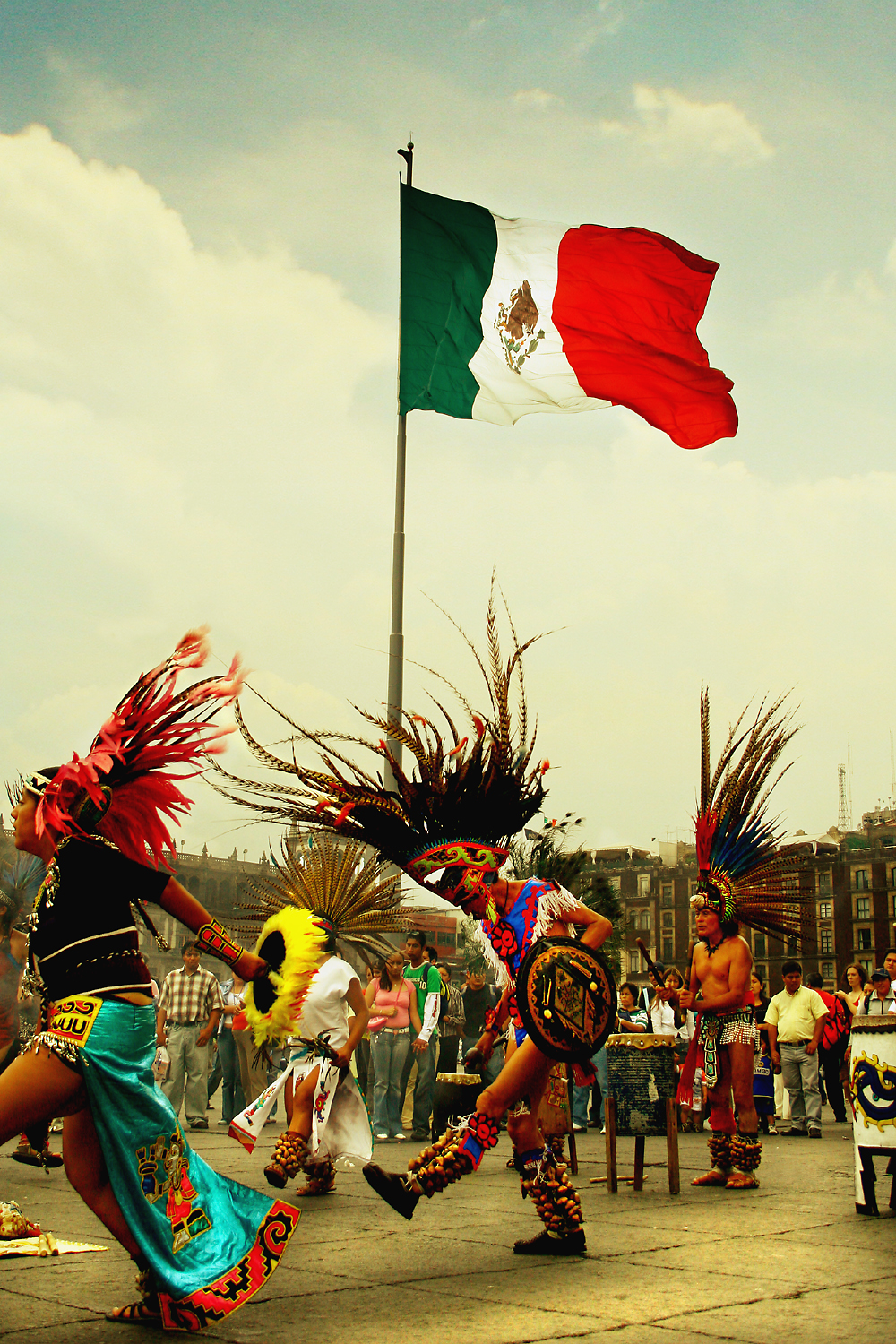
Performance in the Zocalo in Mexico City

While "Concheros" is the oldest and most common name for the dance as performed today, other names are used such as Huehuenches, Chichimecas, Aztecas and Mexicas. Some are regional and some are names that have been used more recently to mark how the dance has evolved.

The dance emerged shortly after the Spanish conquest of the Aztec Empire. It is based on the old "mitote" dance, but modified to include Catholic symbolism as a means of preserving ancient ritual. While the Spanish tried to eliminate as much indigenous culture as possible, total eradication was not possible. In the case of dance, that which could not be suppressed was adapted to Christianity to facilitate the evangelization process. Early dances often had a pre Hispanic idol buried or otherwise hidden.

The dance's origin has been ascribed to the Bajío region, Querétaro and even Tlaxcala, all on the outer edges of the former Aztec Empire. One theory states that it originated as part of a large number of dance innovations, such as re enactments of the Conquest or the battle that subdued the Otomis and Chichimecas near what is now the city of Querétaro . The dance adopted Spanish military terms for its lead dancers such as captain and lieutenant and was originally done by lords and princes who would perform in their finery. This tradition of performing the dance in as fantastic a costume as possible continues to this day. Since then, the dance has been passed down generations. By the 19th century, dancers performed in close collaboration with Catholic confraternities with limited membership often by lineage, which is still the case in many small towns and villages.

Sometime before the end of the 19th century, migrant workers brought the dance to Mexico City and other nearby cities. The spread led to several major lineages of Concheros dancers, as different migrants at different times would form groups in the capital. Many of these city Conchers also allow the admittance of those who do not have a family history of the dance, as well as performing more openly and not always on certain special occasions. Despite this, most Concheros groups claim lineage going back centuries. For Mexico City, one of the most important lineages arrived just before the Mexican Revolution, that ascribed to Jesús González originally from San Miguel Allende. Many of city's oldest dance groups trace their lineage to this man and to the original standard, which now is only a few strips of tattered cloth. However, factionalism has always existed among Concheros both in the north and in Mexico City. Not all Concheros accept the González lineage as authentic.

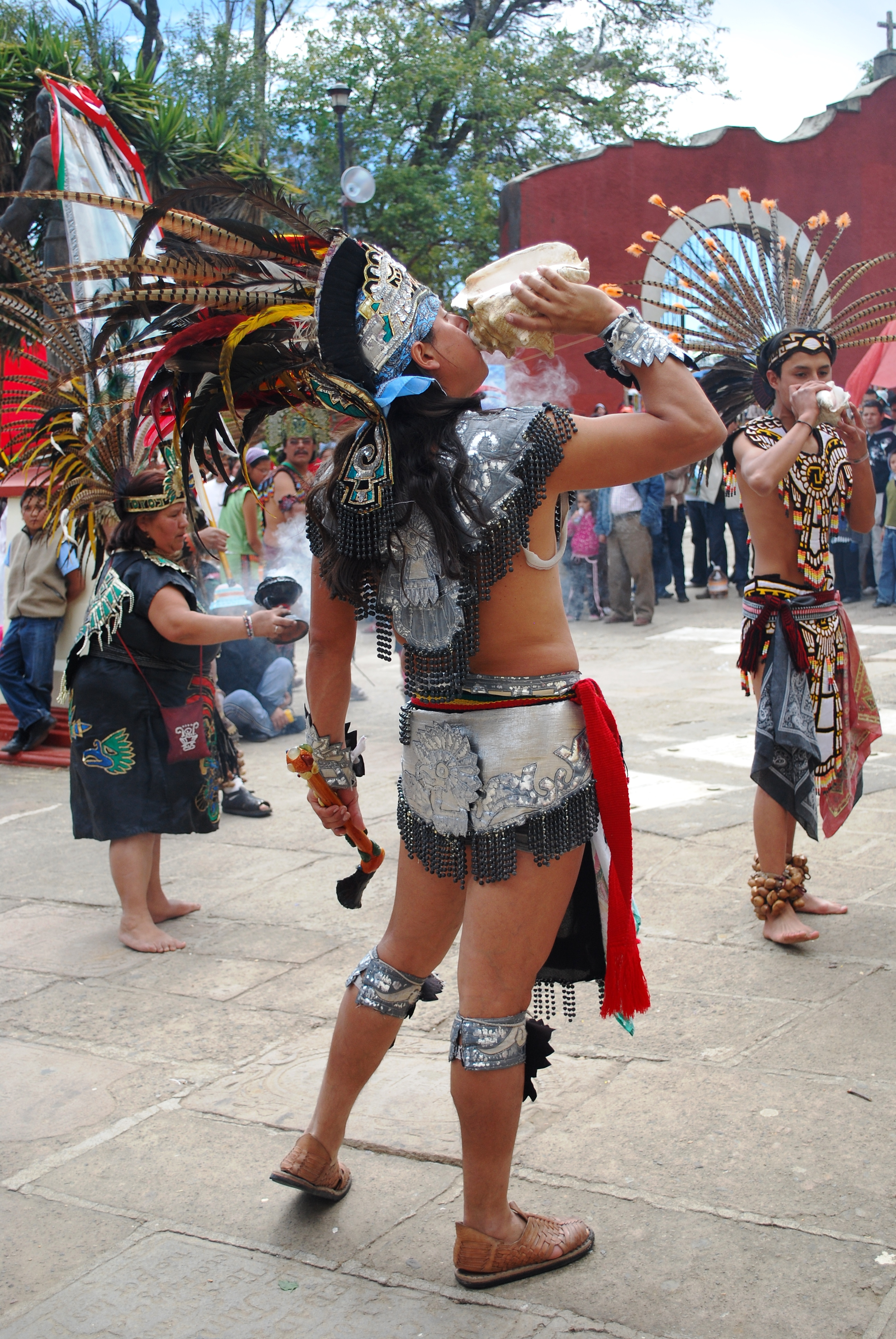
Blowing conch shell in Amecameca.

The changes that occurred in Mexico during and after the Mexican Revolution spurred changes to the dance which have had repercussions to this day. Governments after the war passed anti-Church policies which included the prohibition of public worship in the 1920s. Ironically, the Concheros, who were originally organized to save vestiges of pre Hispanic ritual after the Conquest, became the most ardent defenders of the Catholic Church during the Cristero War, a reaction against the anti Church policies following the Revolution. One reason for this was that laws against public worship forbade them from dancing and many of their dance sites and shrines were destroyed. Some groups perished and others went into hiding, using the same sites they used to hide from Spanish authorities centuries before. Public worship and dance was permitted again in 1929.

Between 1930 and 1950, there were about forty official dance groups with about 4,000 dancers. During this time the population of Mexico grew and the government promoted Mexico's indigenous heritage for both political and economic (tourism) reasons. The number of Concheros grew, especially among the working class in certain major Mexican cities, but it also meant that the dance began to change in meaning from a religious rite to a cultural spectacle, included in the repertoire of Mexican folk dance and even featured in a number of films during Mexico's Golden Age of Cinema. By the 1950s and 1960s, dancers found that they could earn money performing for tourists in places such as Acapulco and Veracruz as well as in government –sponsored folk dance competitions. This has caused a crisis in the identity of the dance which continues to this day, a debate about what is "authentic" and what is not.

The change in focus also became evident in regalia, with some groups starting to discard the tunics with attempts to copy Aztec dress as depicted in the codices. The first men to discard shirts for the dance in the 1940s caused great scandal, especially among dance elders. Those who first introduced this regalia began to call the dance "Azteca" and re introduced the use of conch shell trumpets, the huehuetl and teponaztli drums. In some cases, these were mixed with the concha (Spanish inspired lute) and other European instruments and in others replaced them entirely. The goal for these dancers is to get rid of the European aspects of the dance and return to a "purely indigenous" performance.

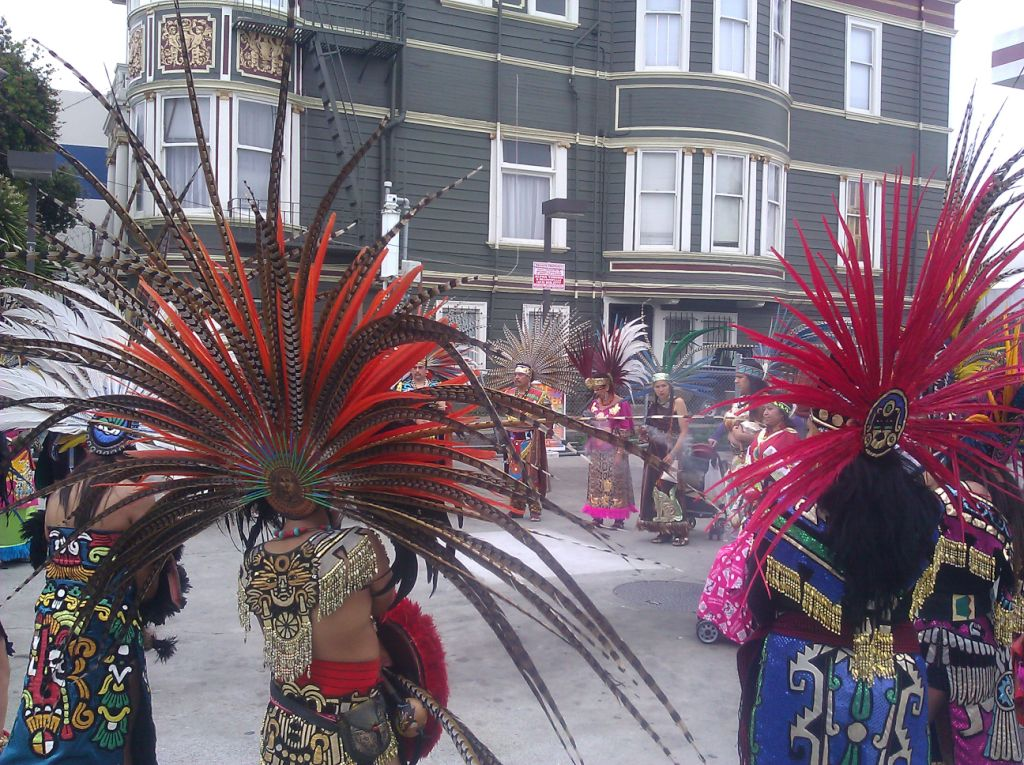
Concheros performing in San Francisco, California

The dance, especially the "Azteca" version of it, arrived to the United States in the mid-1970s. Two dancers, Andres Segura and Florencio Yescas were instrumental in creating Conchero/Azteca groups from California to Texas among Mexican American communities. The dance entered the US at a time when many Mexicans and Mexican Americans were taking more militant stances against the status quo, especially after the 1968 Tlatelolco massacre. A number of dance groups decided to banish the Christian aspects of the dance ceremony entirely and elements of "new age" philosophy had influence. These became more of a political force than a religious one, seeing the pre Conquest world as idyllic and the current world after that time as corrupted. Most of these dancers call the dance "Mexica" (mex-shi-ca) or some variant of the word.

In Mexico, the dance continues to keep its both its Catholic and indigenous elements although other forms of spirituality have had effect. Although there is conscious efforts among the most traditional Conchero dance groups to not change how the dance is done, there has still been innovation, including influence from the Aztecas version.

Until 1992, there was no complete record of the many songs and accompanying music or even the prayers, which have mostly been taught orally.

== Performance ==
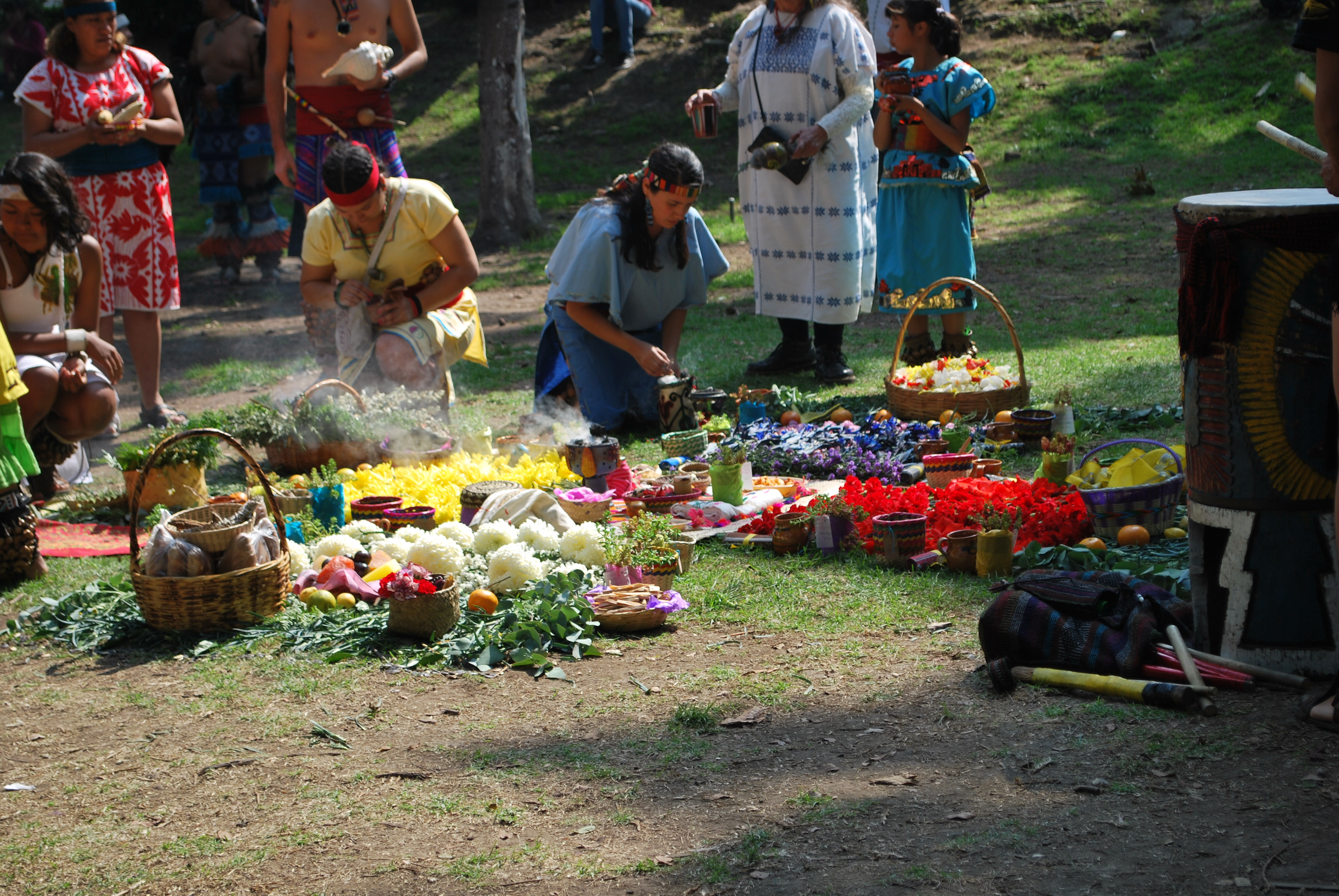
Altar area at Asbaje Park in Tlalpan, Mexico City

While the dance contains a number of highly visual markers of its pre Hispanic roots, it is not strictly indigenous. The dance, with its variations, is a multilayered phenomenon with both religious, cultural and political meanings, depending on the people involved. Most in Mexico who participate in dances say that they do it for personal and/or spiritual reasons, and many are those with mundane city jobs during the week looking for something the "transcends" the ordinary. Most dancers do not do so as performance although the dancers generally attract spectators.

Concheros do not dance alone but are generally organized into groups with hierarchies. The basic group is called a "mesa" (lit. table). The most traditional of the Conchero groups in Mexico are registered with the Association of Concheros, and generally part of a complex associative network based on interpersonal relationships. Most conchero groups consider themselves as "descendents" of a "dance forefather" who is named in the standard of the mesa. Each mesa has a group of officers such as a captain, alférez, sergeants and soldiers with a special post held by women called malinche. The captain may be a man or a woman but the post is often hereditary and is recognized by other Conchero groups. The captain's house contains an altar with the image of the group's patron saint as well as the group's standard. The captain is in charge of organizing pilgrimages, and other ritual obligations, sometimes even paying for the expenses of the group. Dancers are both individual and group. The standard is held during events by the second lieutenant. Sergeants maintain order during ritual. Malinches are in charge of the censers for the constant ritual cleansing of space. Traditional Conchero dance groups consider their performance as spiritual and therefore do not solicit donations. Those who do are called “chimaleros.”

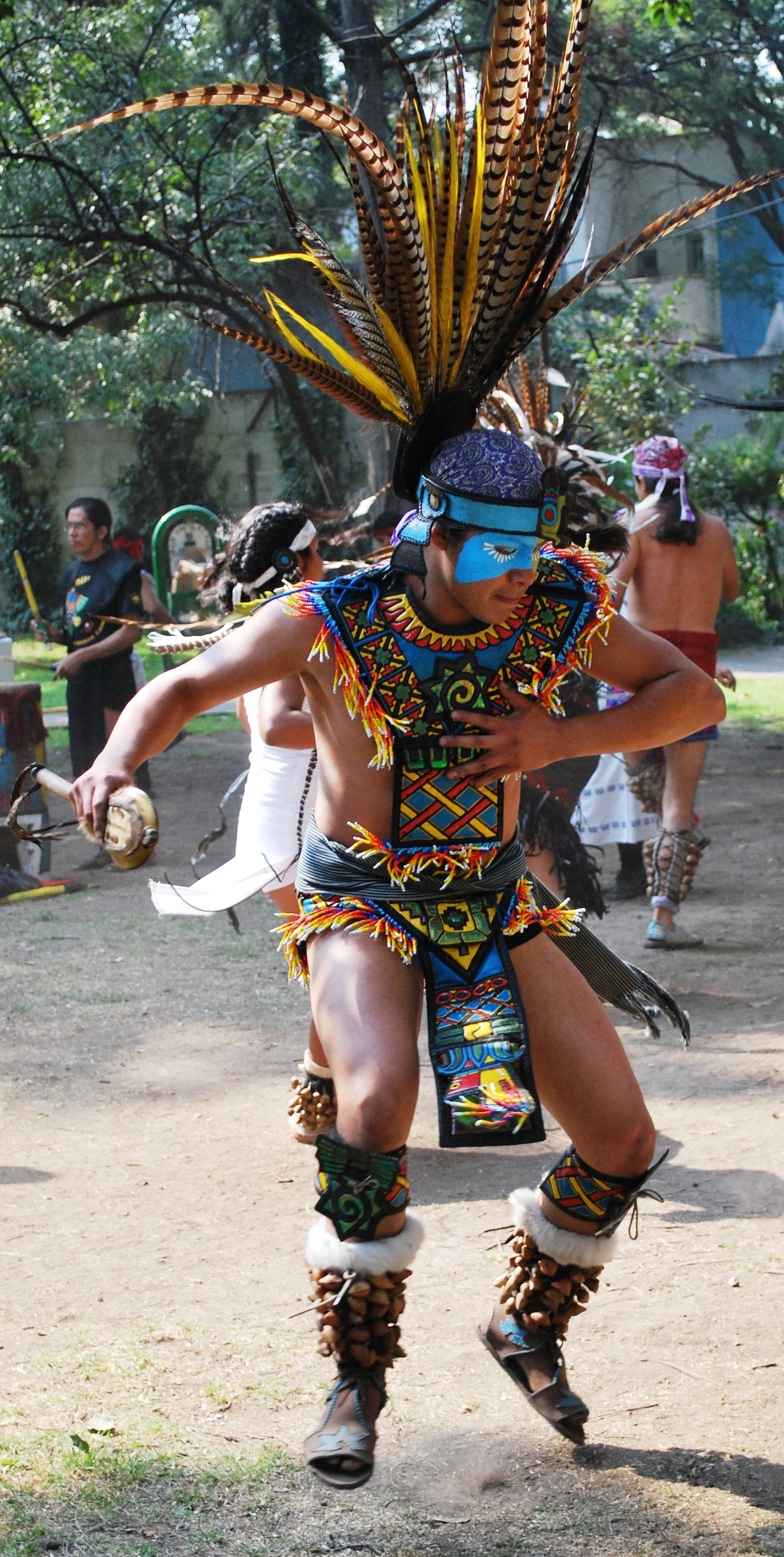
Younger dancer at Asbaje Park

When performing at a church, the traditional Concheros will acknowledge the patron saints of the site, when walk in two lines towards the outside atrium or square, fronted by the second lieutenant holding the standard. The officers take a place which becomes the center, surrounded by the other dancers. There is often an inner circle which consists of the leaders, and altar, the drummers and the older members of the group and an outer circle with younger dancers often with males and females alternating. The dance circles is divided into four sections with the lieutenants marking the cardinal directions.

Before dancing, the Concheros call on deity and their ancestors, perform ritual cleansing with the aim of bringing the past and present together. One of these songs or praises is a mentioning of the four winds or cardinal directions, linked to the Four Evangelists. The main instruments of Concheros dancers include two pre Hispanic drums called a huehuetl and a teponaztli, conch shell trumpets and conchas, lute instruments made from the shell of an armadillo or other stringed instruments. The drums are generally in the center with various dancers holding the other instruments and with rattles (like the ayoyotes) in their hands and on their legs. The altar is often profusely decorated with flowers, candles, colored paper and many other objects.

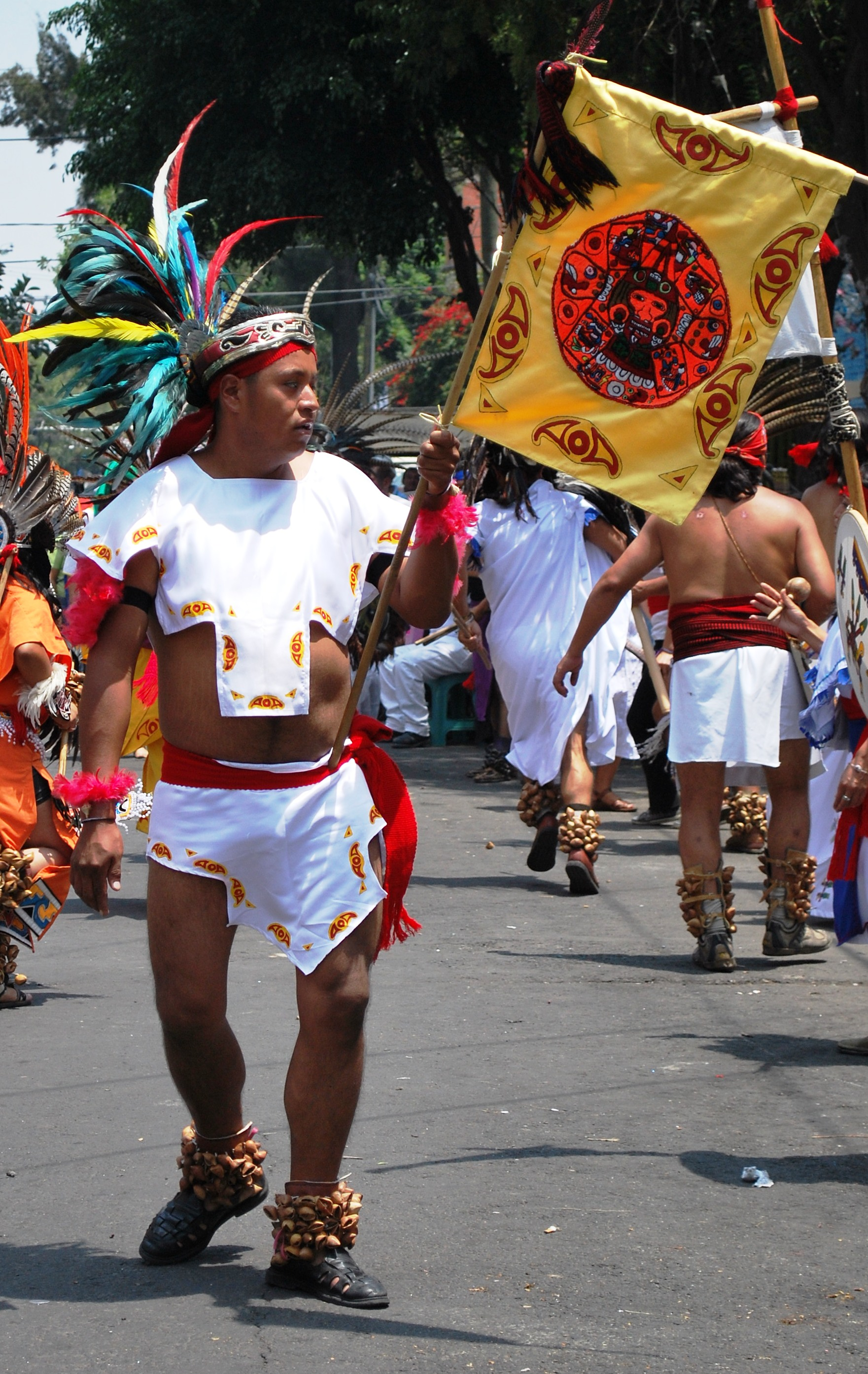
Carrying standard of mesa or dance group

Upon signal, the two circles of dancers move, dancing both as a group and individually. The captain generally stays stationary in the middle. The inner circle with the elders moves more slowly and the outer circle contains younger dancers who generally perform more vibrantly with leaps and other difficult movements. The rhythm increases speed with occasional dancer breaking ranks to dance around the formation. Near the end of the session the speed slows and the captains dance. Most of the basic steps and much of the symbolism are pre Hispanic.

The circle's focus is inward often to the group's banner. The dancers are often enveloped in incense smoke. Conchero dancers do not touch each other and most movement is restricted to feet and torsos, leaving hands free to play various musical instruments. Many of the dancers and musicians also sing. Dance sets are interspersed with peregrinations, praying or singing.

Azteca or Mexica dancers perform the same dances, but do not play concha lutes, wear costumes which are more "indigenous" and generally dispense with the religious ceremony, especially the Catholic. They generally do not visit churches. These dancers are generally younger with minimal clothing, sometimes only loincloths, made with natural materials. The dances are more flamboyant with leaps and extra steps. There are also women in these groups but fewer. They tend to be more individualistic, often with competition among the Mexica dancers through performance and/or attire. These dancers are considered a subgroup to the tradition and are not recognized by the Association of Concheros. Both groups claim tradition, with the Mexica claiming to "rid" the dance of Spanish elements and "restore" it to its pre Hispanic form. The Mexica are dominant in the Zocalo during the week as a political statement. For the Mexica the symbolism is as important if not more important than the dance itself.

== Uniforms – Atuendo ==
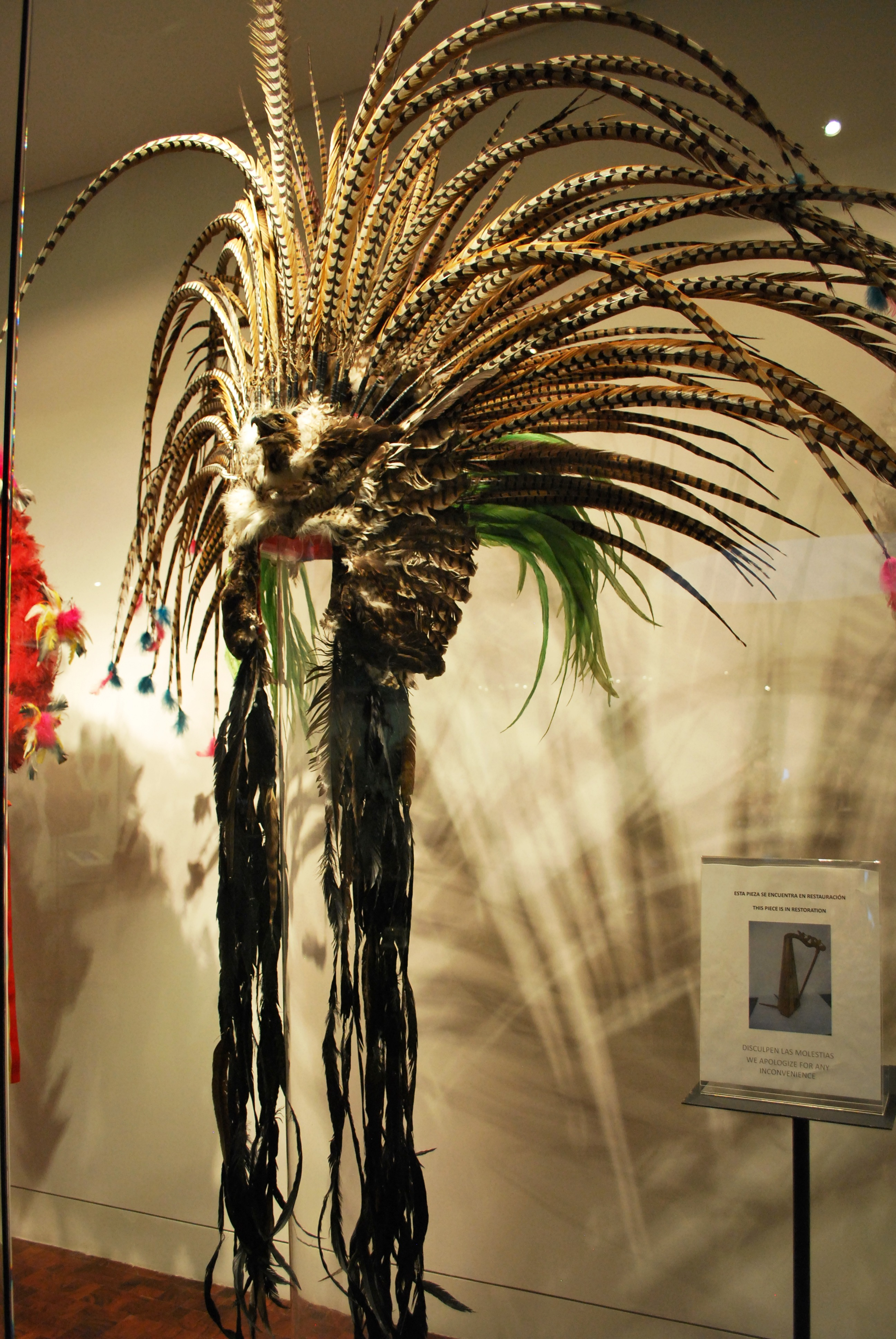
Conchero headdress at the Museo de Arte Popular in Mexico City

Clothing can range from completely covered to nearly nude. Dancers dress as lavishly as economy permits. Regalia include various elements such as animal parts, painted scenes related to religion, history, war, hunting and agriculture. The most traditional outfits are made from natural elements, but are often mixed with commercial fabrics such as denim.

The most traditional Conchero dances wear tunics called naguillas (little skirt) and often a cape. These dancers will also have large quantities of gold and silver colored adornments and headdresses made of dyed ostrich feathers. Azteca or Mexica costumes tend to not wear tunics, instead try to copy Aztec dress as depicted in Mesoamerican codices, sometimes with elements of North American Indian dress. Headdresses tend to be made with pheasant feathers. The two styles of dress are not completely separate, especially in Mexico, where Azteca dress has influenced that of the more traditional Concheros, and vice versa.

One other form of vestments is found in San Luis Potosí where the dance is called "Apaches". Here dancers wear trousers and a brightly colored shirt along with a naguilla covered in sequins and beads. They wear a headdress with colorful feathers and mirrors with calfskin-soled sandals on their feet. A wooden bow is held in the left hand and a gourd rattle is in the right. This style of uniforms has been greatly influenced by popular culture, and Hollywood movies.

== Dance locations ==
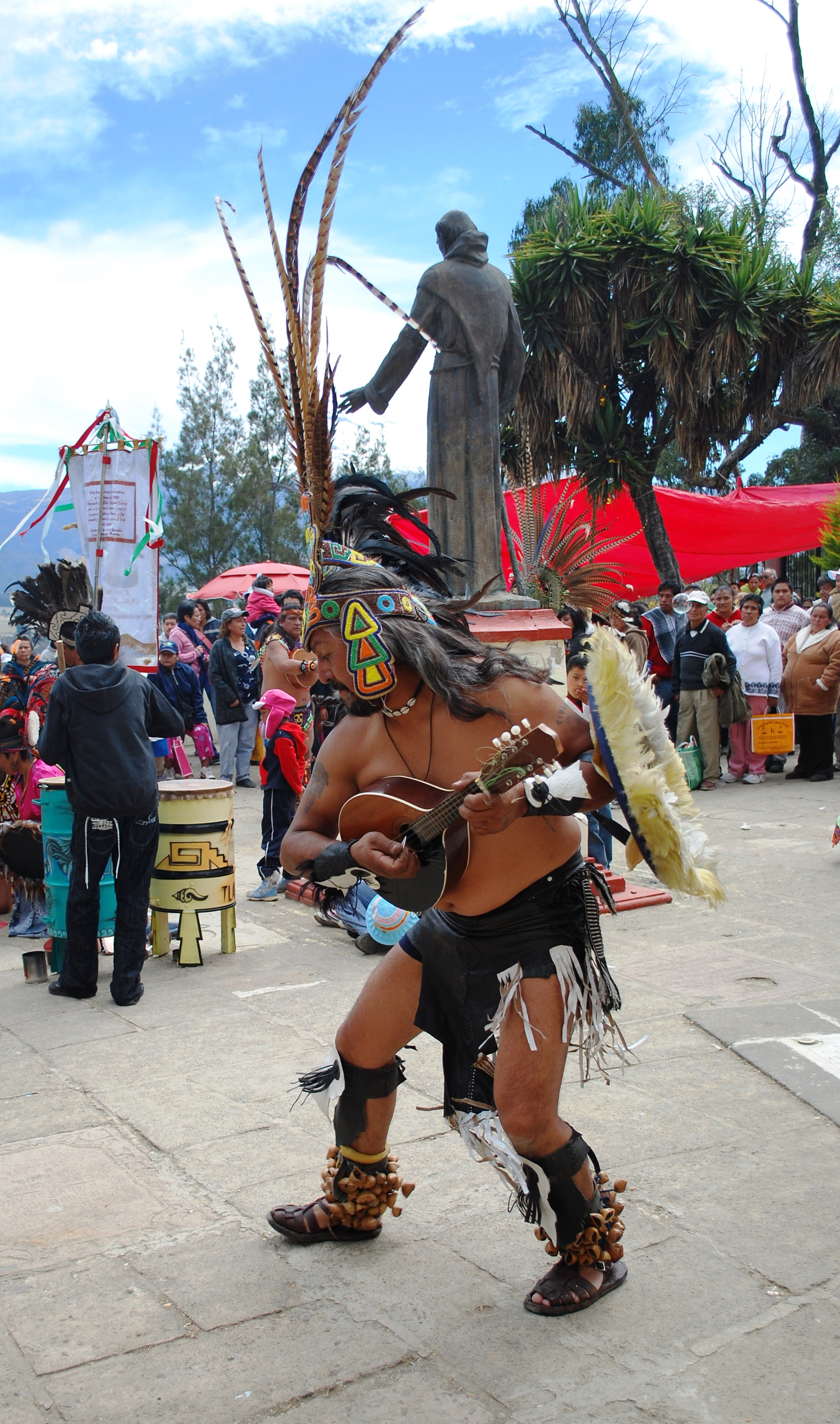
Dancer with mandolin at Amecameca

Many Conchero (and Azteca) groups are located in and around Mexico City. But there are many, large and important groups in Querétaro (the birthplace of La Danza Conchera/Chichimeca/Azteca), Guanajuato, Jalisco (especially near Zapopan), Hidalgo, Morelos, Michoacán, Zacatecas, and as far north as Chihuahua. The dance sacred space of Mexico City reflects the older Otomí and Chichimeca space of Querétaro. Sacred sites like "La Peña de Bernal, Tequizquiapan, and others, marked out the eight ritual directions of ancestor worship and annual cleansing. Today, because many "Azteca" dancers do not know the deep historical roots of La Danza Conchera in Querétaro and Guanajuato, the four cardinal markers of Conchero time and space are seen from the lens of the dwellers of Mexico City. This is because the dancers favor the loci of Mexico's cultural or historical memory (Imperial and powerful Mexi'ca emperors; vast rich and splendorous colonial monuments; and the golden memories of the 1910 Mexican revolution and its muralists) as well as for religious reasons. Most people first see Conchero dancers in the main square of Mexico City, called the Zocalo. The groups that dance in the Zocalo are usually groups that do not have deep trans-generational roots in La Danza Conchera, or that are dancing for tourists donations. Most mesas dance there only occasionally, generally for political events or historical/civic events linked to Aztec cultural icons. The Zocalo has also been a popular area since the 1990s for learning the dance in a non-ritual situation. It is important because the Zocalo is important to Mexico's political and cultural identity as it marks the historical center of Mexico City and the center of the Aztec city-state of Tenochtitlan . Another important site in the city is Tlatelolco, especially on July 15, the day of Saint James.

The other most important sites for Conchero dance form a rough cross extending out from the historic center of Mexico City, and include the Villa de Guadalupe in the north (which is Tonantzin), Amecameca in the east, (which is either Tlaloc or Tepeyollotl), Chalma in the south (which is either Tlaoc or Tezcatlihpoca) and Los Remedios in the west (which is Mayahuel). These sites are marked by religious images, the Virgin of Guadalupe, the Christ of Sacromonte, the Christ of Chalma and the Virgin of the Remedies respectively. In large celebrations the movement of the circles can be constrained by neighboring ones. The main pilgrimage to the Virgin of Guadalupe is on 12 December, and it is the most important pilgrimage in Mexico. The annual pilgrimage to Amecameca is on Ash Wednesday. The image of this Christ is kept in a cave, which used to contain an idol of Tlaloc. The image is taken out of the cave during this time and taken to the parish church. Chalma is an important meeting place for the various Conchero mesas, giving the captains a chance to meet and discuss matters of mutual importance. Most mesas have crosses which are placed on the hills around the sanctuary. During the annual pilgrimage, this cross is taken down, repainted and repaired, blessed and returned to its place. The annual pilgrimage here is usually during Holy Week. The Concheros head to the Virgin of the Remedies on September 10 which is located in Naucalpan. This shrine and image is generally linked to "La Noche Triste" and the eventual defeat of the Aztecs. This small virgin was created in Spain during the "Reconquista" of Spain from the Muslims. It came with Hernán Cortés and was lost on "La Noche triste". This night is when it is said Cortés cried for his men who dies when the Spanish were forced to evacuate Tenochtitlan. He cried under a Cypress tree (ahuehuete) in Popotla. The image was lost, and decades later, the image here is said to have been found under a maguey plant by an Otomi chief.

Conchero dancers in San Miguel de Allende, in March 2026

Each year, in San Miguel de Allende, on the first Thursday and Friday of March, conchero or “Chichimeca” dancers from nearby towns dance to drums in pre-Hispanic regalia, in honor of “Christ of the Conquest”. This Christ is an ancient statue created of corn stalks and orchid bulbs. One source states that the event "represents the acceptance of Christ by the indigenous peoples ... a way of preserving indigenous heritage after the Catholic conquest in Mexico".

== See also ==
- Concheras
