= Conchera =

Mexican stringed instrument

Concheras
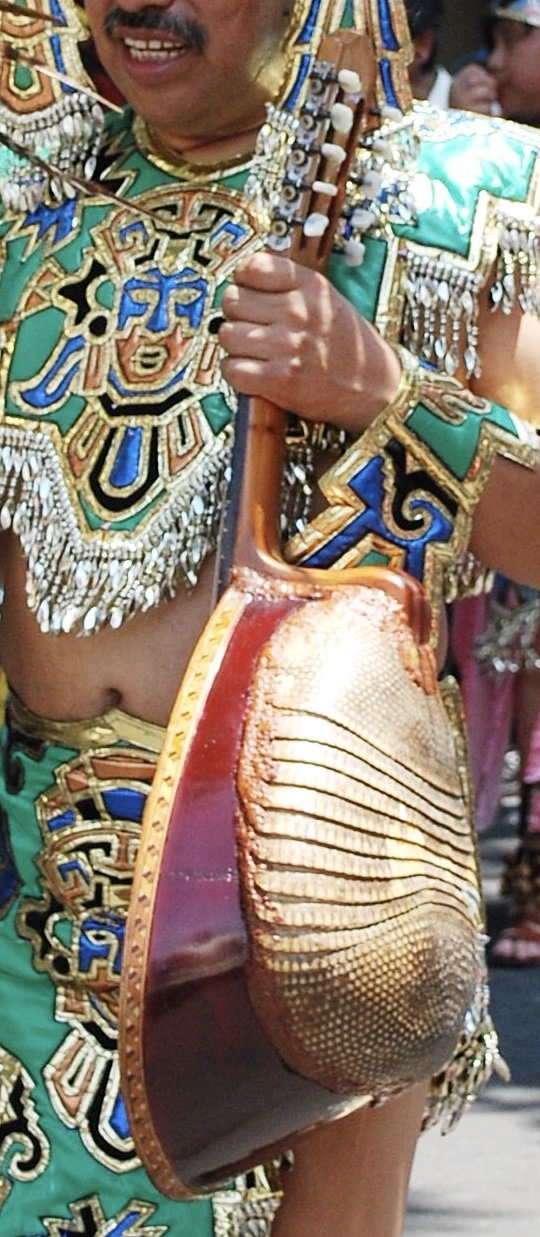
- Closeup view of a vihuela conchera, a Native-American lute from Mexico. Many modern instruments put the armadillo shell on the outside of a wooden bowl, instead of using the shell for a bowl.

String instrument
- Other names: Conchas
- Classification: String instrument Plucked string instrument
- Hornbostel–Sachs classification: 321.321-6 (Chordophone whose body is shaped like a bowl with permanently attached resonator and neck, sounded by a plectrum)
- Developed: from lute or possibly vihuela between 16th and 19th centuries

Playing range
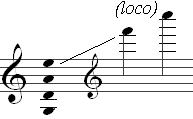
- (mandolin tuning); 130pc (vihuela Mexicana tuning); (standard guitar tuning)

Related instruments
- charango, mandolin, Mexican vihuela, guitar, lute

A conchera or concha is Mexican stringed-instrument, plucked by concheros dancers. The instruments were important to help preserve elements of native culture from Eurocentric-Catholic suppression. The instruments are used by concheros dancers for singing at velaciones (nighttime rituals) and for dancing at obligaciones (dance obligations).

== Types ==
The bodies of the lutes were traditionally made from a concha (armadillo shell). Today the bowls may be made of wood and the mandolin have a flat back.

- mandolinos de concheros or mandolina conchera: with 4 double courses (8 strings), tuned as mandolin (g-d-a-e).
- vihuelas de concheros or vihuela conchera: with 5 double courses (10 strings). Tuned as vihuela, but in the 3rd, 4th and 5th courses, each string in a course tuned to an octave of the other string.
- guitarras de concheros or guitarra conchera: with 6 double courses (12 strings). Tuned as guitar, but in the 3rd, 4th, 5th and 6th courses, each string in a course tuned to an octave of the other string.

== History ==
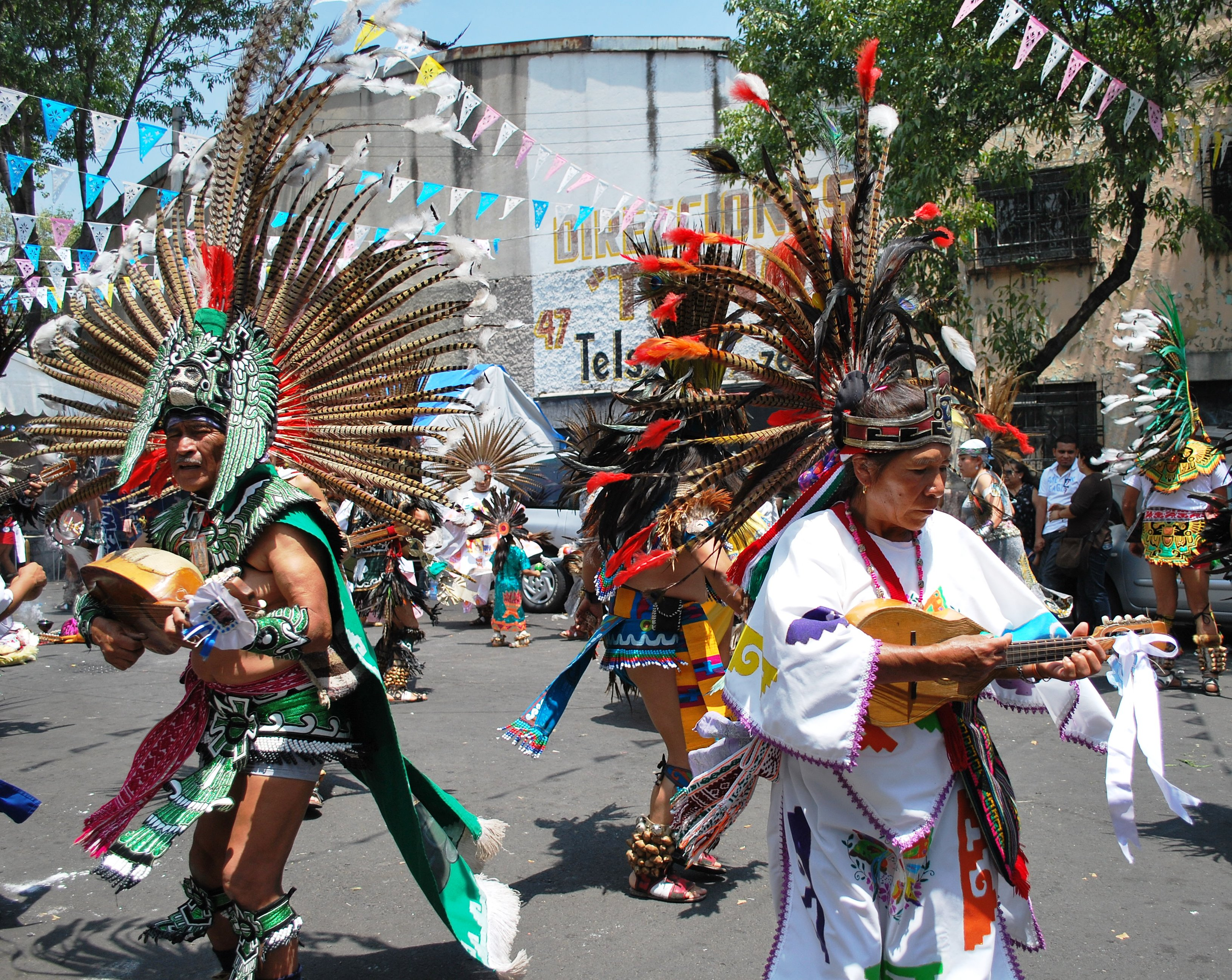
Older couple dancing and playing conchas in honor of the Virgin of San Juan de los Lagos in Colonia Doctores, Mexico City. At left, a vihuela de conchera. At right a mandolin or mandolina de conchera.

After the arrival of the Spanish conquerors to Mexico in 1519, the indigenous musicians and instrument makers of central Mexico, took up European instruments. Tradition has it that the instruments were adopted by Native Americans in what is now modern Mexico in the 16th century. At least one person, not involved in the tradition, has speculated that the birth of the instrument might be closer to the mid-18th century.

The Spanish church leaders had prohibited the use of drums to Native Americans, in an effort to eliminate their dancing, which was tied to the drum rhythms. However the Spanish did not object to the Native-Americans learning to play European instruments. The Native-Americans took their drum rhythms and incorporated then into music on the lutes to "preserve the original beats of Danza rhythms." They used the Spanish instruments to "preserve their own songs, rhythms and sacred knowledge."

They copied the violin, the chirimia (a primitive version of the Oboe that came from the Muslims of North Africa), the lute, and the mandolin (or its predecessors the vandola or gittern). The native instrument makers were so adept at creating beautiful sounding instruments, that soon the Spanish crown forbid the locals from making instruments, because this was taking business from the Spanish instrument makers of Europe and colonial Mexico. The natives were unable to make the wooden parts for the belly, for lack of the small, thin, wooden strips that are glued together to make a lute's bowl. They substituted a natural bowl, made of an armadillo shell. The instrument took its name from the shell, and the dancers from the instrument.

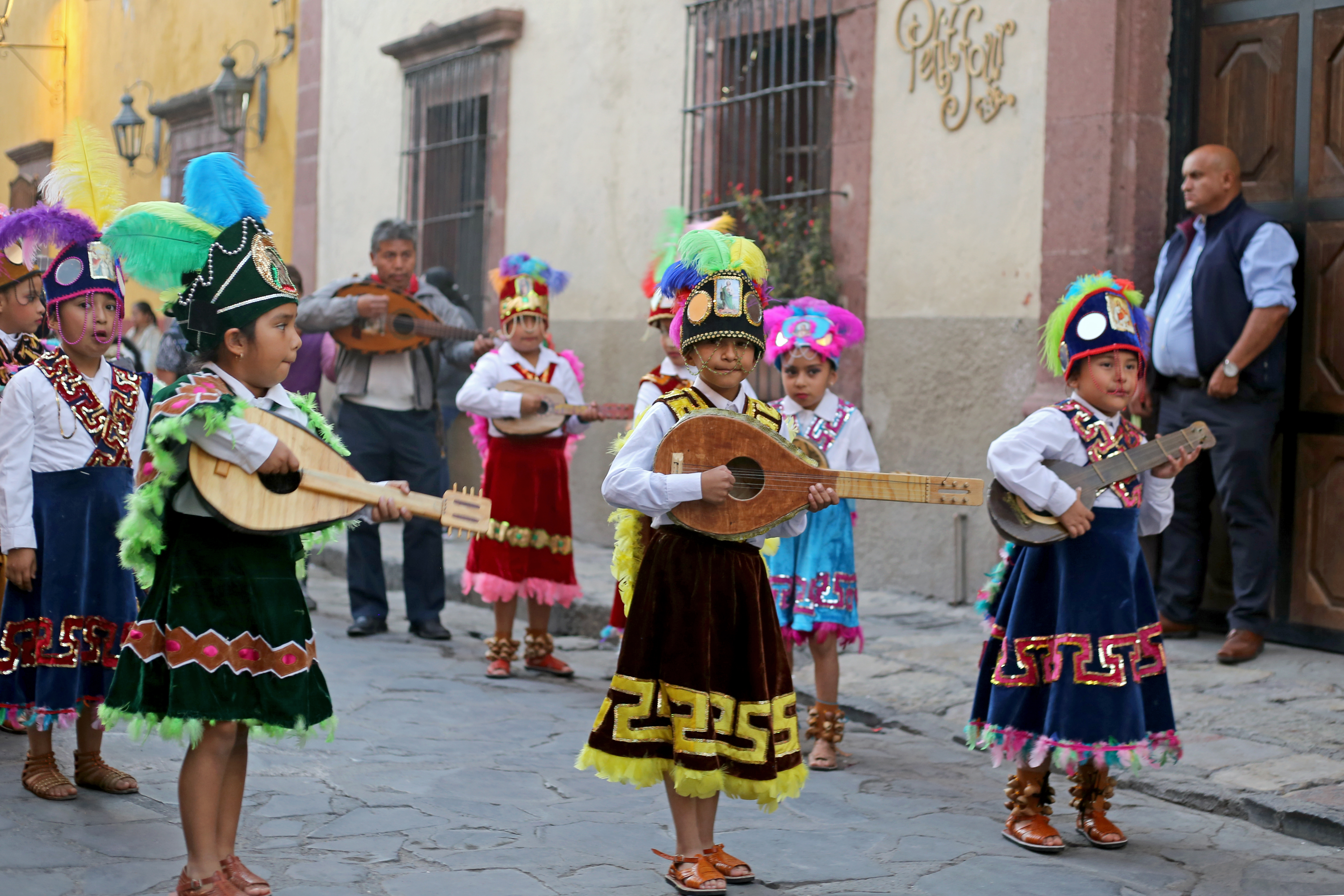
Children holding concheras; following the traditions of the shell dances, these children parade in the streets of San Miguel de Allende.

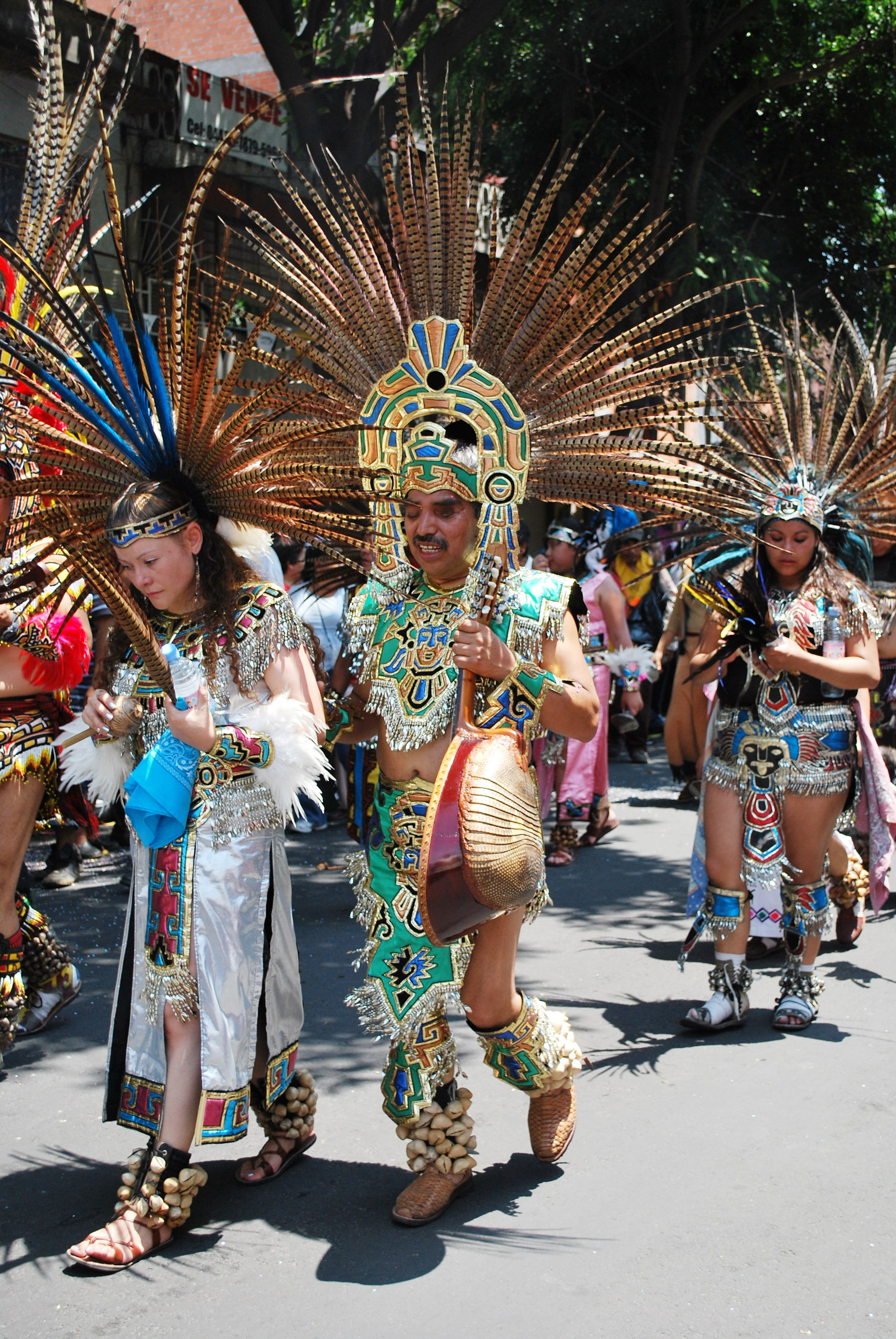
Concheros at a celebration of the Feast of the Virgin of San Juan de los Lagos in Colonia Doctores, Mexico City. The man is holding a vihuela de conchera, with a clear view of the armadillo.

== Other names for the Conchas ==
Some of the dancers who use the conchas call them "Mecahuehuetl" (from Nahuatl Meca(tl) = chord + Huehue(tl)= old one "drum", which was also the name for the vihuela and is used for the guitar today. This name reflects the fact that the early Conchero dancers were able to encrypt the precolumbian rhythms and steps of their agrarian rituals into the musical chords of the guitars and mandolins. A traditional conchero can tell which step should be carried out by how the melody is being strummed on the conchas. Another name used for the armadillo-shelled instruments is "Chihuanda." The etymology of this term is uncertain, with Purépecha seen as the most commonly agreed to root.
