= Ayoyotes =

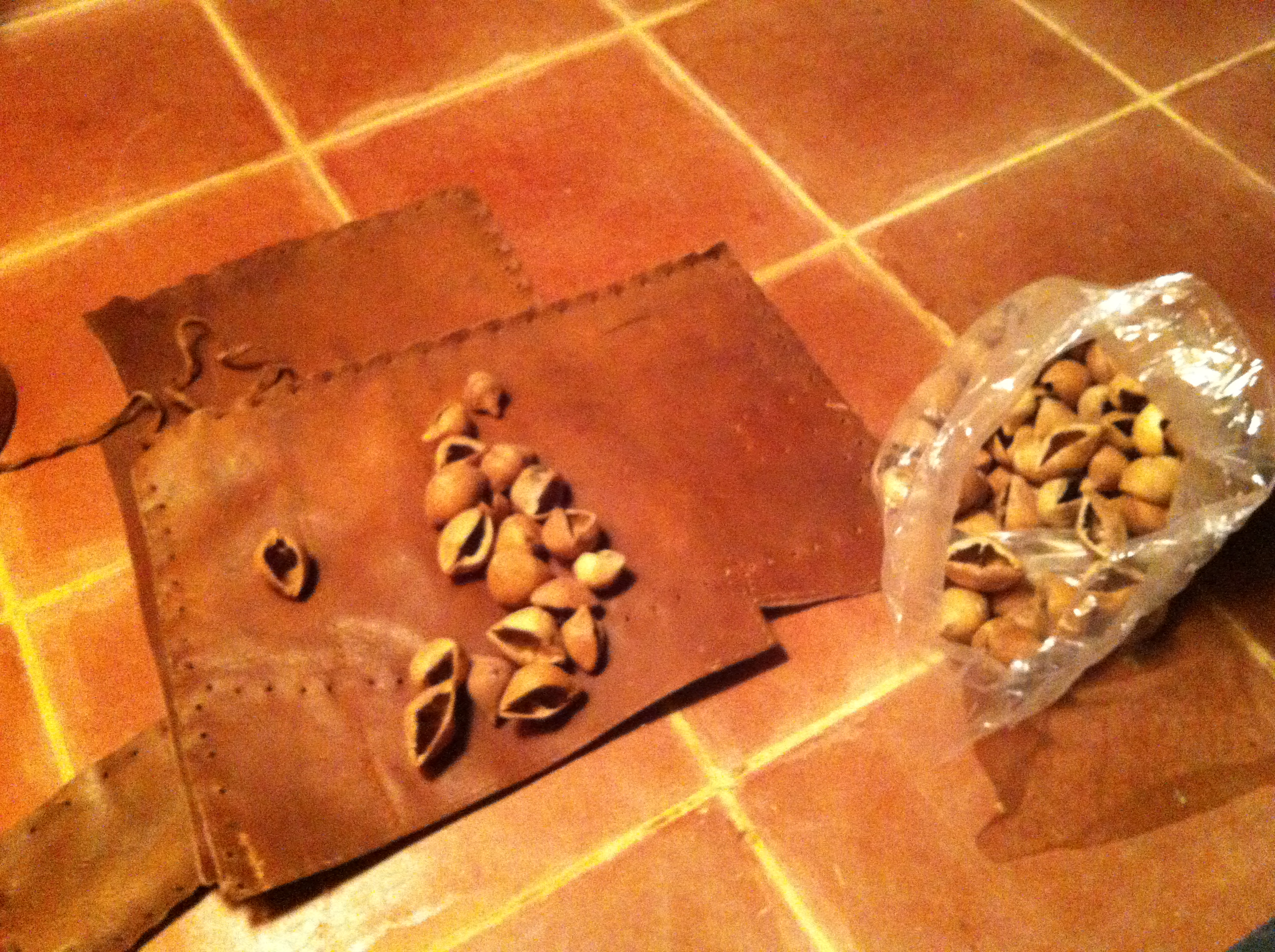
- Ayoyotes

Percussion instrument
- Other names: Ayoyotl
- Classification: Percussion
- Inventor(s): Aztecs

The ayoyotes, ayoyotl, aztec jingles or huesos de fraile, are an idiophone percussion instrument of the Aztecs. It consists of a set of hard shells from the ayoyote or chachayote (chachayotl) tree of Thevetia genus, fixed to skin or cloth pieces in order to be tied to the ankles or wrists of the dancer or musician. Its sound is similar to that of the rain. This idiophone is used in concheros dance.
