= Christian ritual =

Christian ritual may refer to:

- Christian liturgy
- Christian prayer
- Christian worship
- Rite (Christianity)
- Sacrament
