= Huehuetl =

Percussion instrument from Mexico

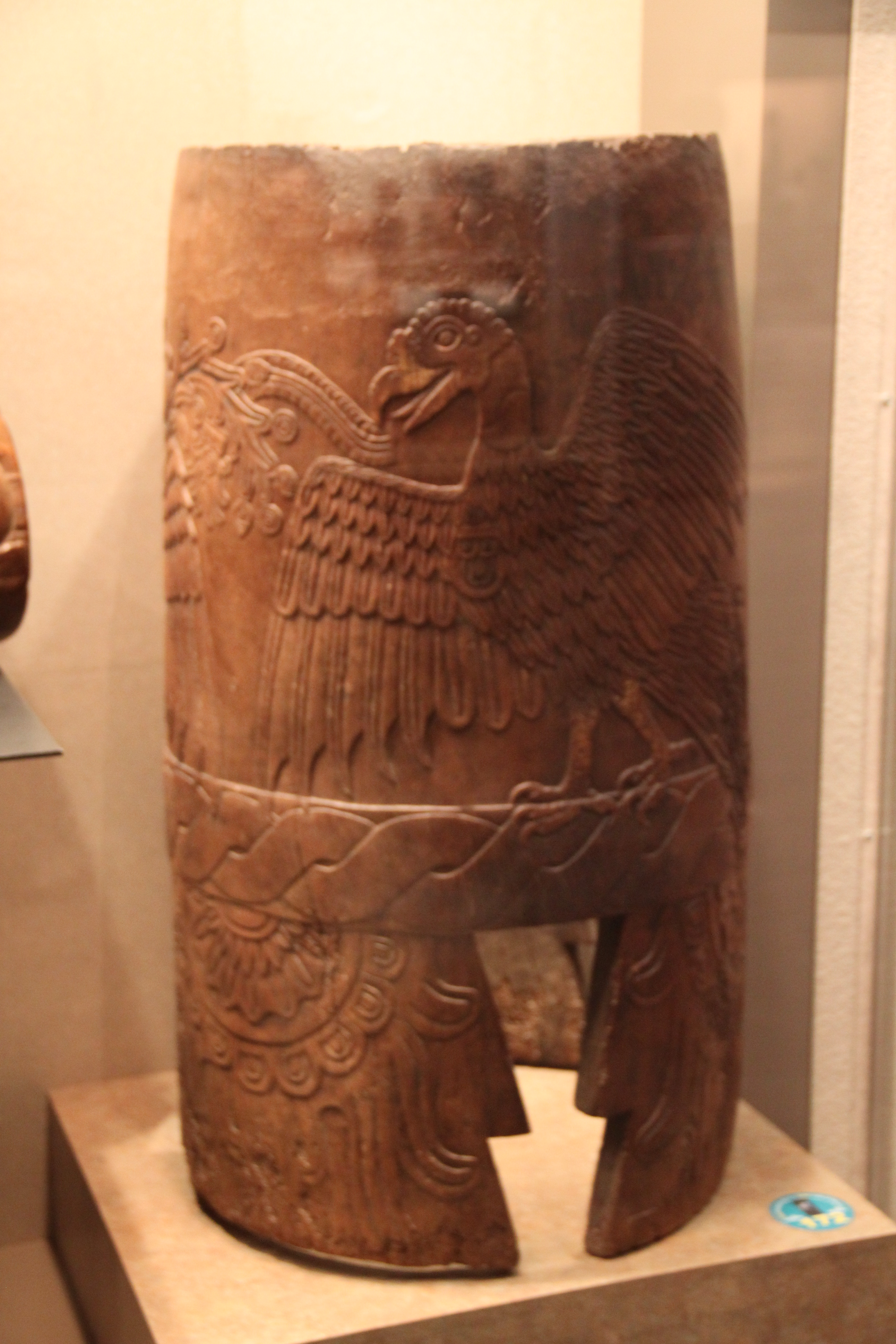
Aztec Tlālpanhuēhuētl with Symbols of War, National Museum of Anthropology, Mexico City

The huēhuētl [ˈweːweːt͡ɬ] is a percussion instrument from Mexico, used by the Aztecs and other cultures. It is an upright tubular drum made from a wooden body opened at the bottom that stands on three legs cut from its base, with skin stretched over the top. It can be beaten by hand or wood mallet.

== Description ==
This ancient percussion instrument originated from Mesoamerica and was often used by the Aztecs and Tarascan. The huehuetl were used during festivals such as warrior gatherings. The drum itself is made from hollowed tree trunks and thus, came in different sizes. Carvings of animals, faces or warriors were also often carved into the base of the drum. The skin used for the top of the drum was mainly from ocelots. Currently, there are still groups of musicians who use huehuetls to perform Aztec music.

== Terminology ==
| Terminology | | | 1st Component | | | 2nd Component | | |
| English | Nahuatl | IPA | English | Nahuatl | IPA | English | Nahuatl | IPA |
|---|---|---|---|---|---|---|---|---|
| drum | huēhuētl | [ˈweːweːt͡ɬ] | old (adjective) | huēhuē | [ˈweːweː] | singular noun suffix | -tl | [t͡ɬ] |
| medium size drum | panhuēhuētl | [panˈweːweːt͡ɬ] | | | | | | |
| large drum | tlālpanhuēhuētl | Nahuatl pronunciation: [t͡ɬaːɬpanˈweːweːt͡ɬ] | on the ground or throughout the country | tlālpan | [ˈt͡ɬaːɬpan] | drum | huēhuētl | [ˈweːweːt͡ɬ] |
| war drum | yāōhuēhuētl | [yaːoːˈweːweːt͡ɬ] | war | yāōtl | [ˈjaːoːt͡ɬ] | drum | huēhuētl | [ˈweːweːt͡ɬ] |
| huēhuētl drummer | huēhuēhuah | [weːˈweːwaʔ] | | | | | | |
| drumming | tlatzotzonalli | [t͡ɬat͡sot͡soˈnalːi] | | | | | | |
| to drum | tlatzotzona | [t͡ɬat͡soˈt͡sona] | | | | | | |
| musical instrument | tlatzotzonalōni | [t͡ɬat͡sot͡sonaˈloːni] | | | | | | |

== Gallery ==
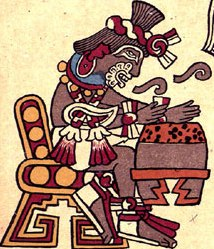
Huēhuētl drawing in an ancient manuscript.

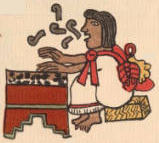
huēhuētl from page 060 of the Codex Magliabecchi

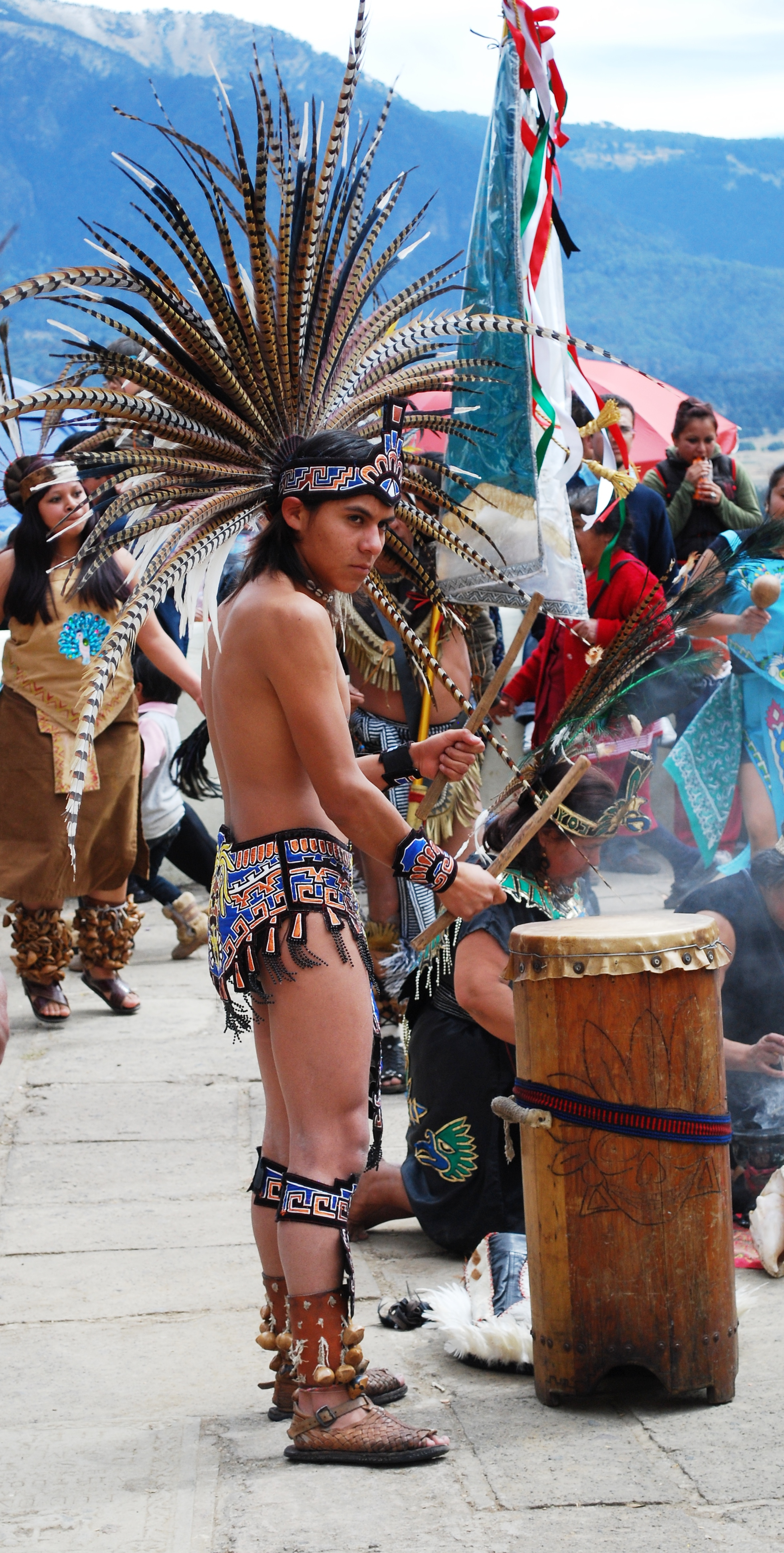
Nahua stick drummer

== See also ==
- Teponaztli
