= Colonia Doctores =

Coordinates: 19°25′3.38″N 99°8′50.74″W

- Neighborhood of Mexico City
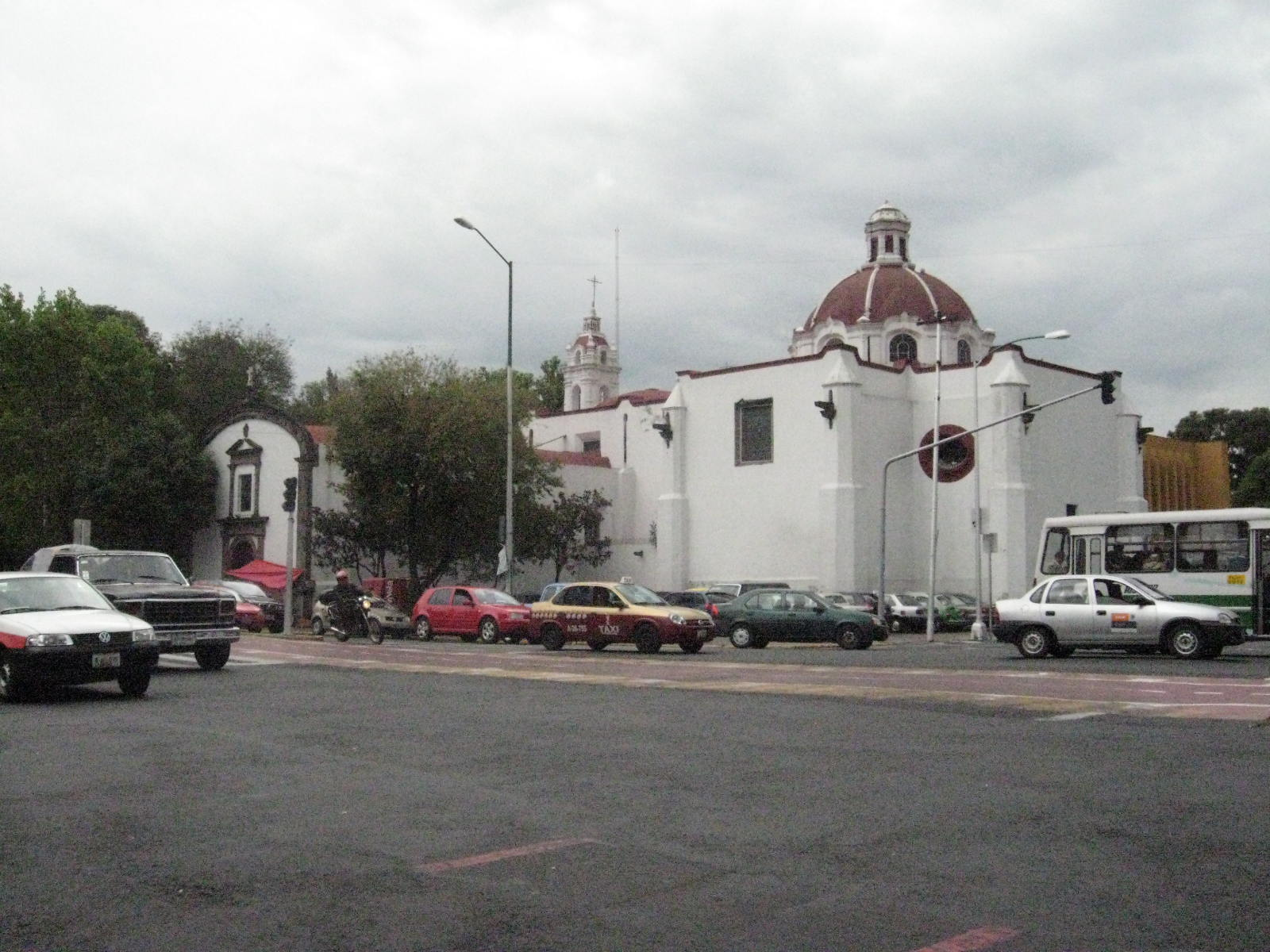
- Temple of "Nuestra Señora de Belén" (Our Lady of Bethlehem) located on Arco de Belen street

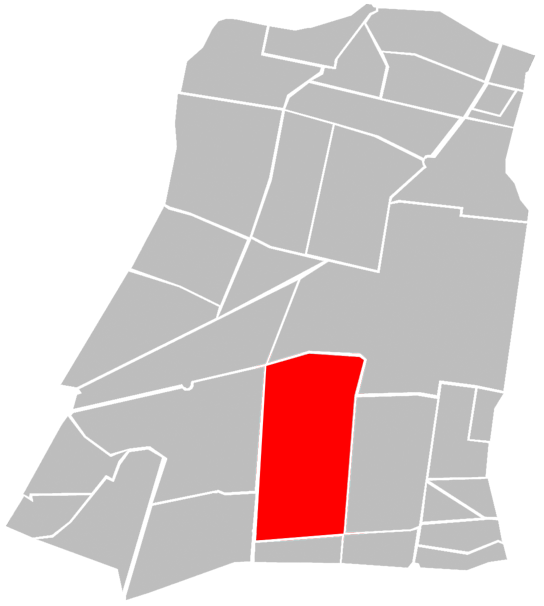
- Location of Colonia Doctores (in red) within Cuauhtémoc borough
- Country: Mexico
- City: Mexico City
- Borough: Cuauhtémoc

Population (2010)
  - Total: 44,703

Colonia Doctores (English: Doctors' Colony) is an official neighborhood just southwest of the historic center of Mexico City. It is bordered by Avenida Cuauhtémoc to the west, across from Belen Street to the north, Eje Central to the east and Eje 3 Sur José Peón Contreras to the south.

== History ==
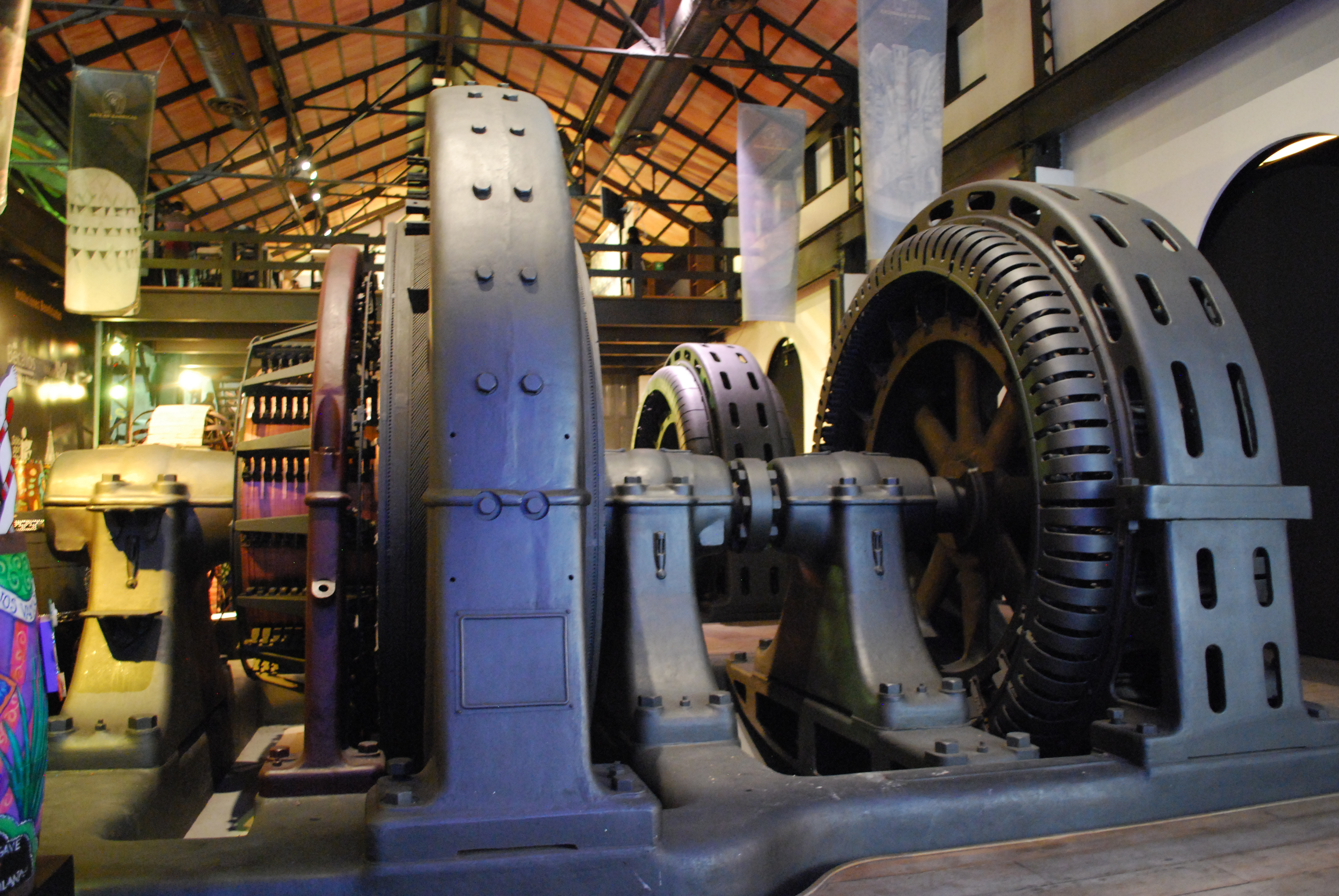
Generators at the Centro Cultural Estación Indianilla

The neighborhood was planned by Francisco Lascuráin in 1889, in an area called "La Indianilla". This name came from three indigenous women named María Clara, María Concepción and María Paula, who sold some of their land here to Father Domingo Pérez Barcia to build a small chapel. However, Lascuràin never followed through with his plans to construct the neighborhood. In 1895, The Mexican City Property Syndicate Limited proposed the plan to lay out the neighborhood anew, gaining approval of the Mexico City ayuntamiento. The major streets such as Niños Heroes, Dr. Lavista, and Dr. Río de la Loza were laid out.

Originally the colonia was called "Hidalgo" but, as almost all of the streets here are named after famous physicians, the area became known as "Doctores", leading to its current official name.

In 1880, Ramón Guzmán, owner of an enterprise of streetcars pulled by mules, established a yard there for the maintenance and storage of his vehicles. Today the Procuraduría de Justicia del D.F. (Court house of the Federal District) is located in its place. A couple of decades later, a large part of this area was owned by the Compañía de Tranvías (also known as the Mexican Electric Transway), serving as a trainyard as well as housing workshops for the maintenance and repair of rail cars. This service began in 1900. The presence of train engineers, who worked all hours, gave rise to that of vendors selling food, especially chicken soup ("caldo de pollo") in the late night and early morning hours. This tradition remains, and the area is noted for its soup.

== Sites of interest ==
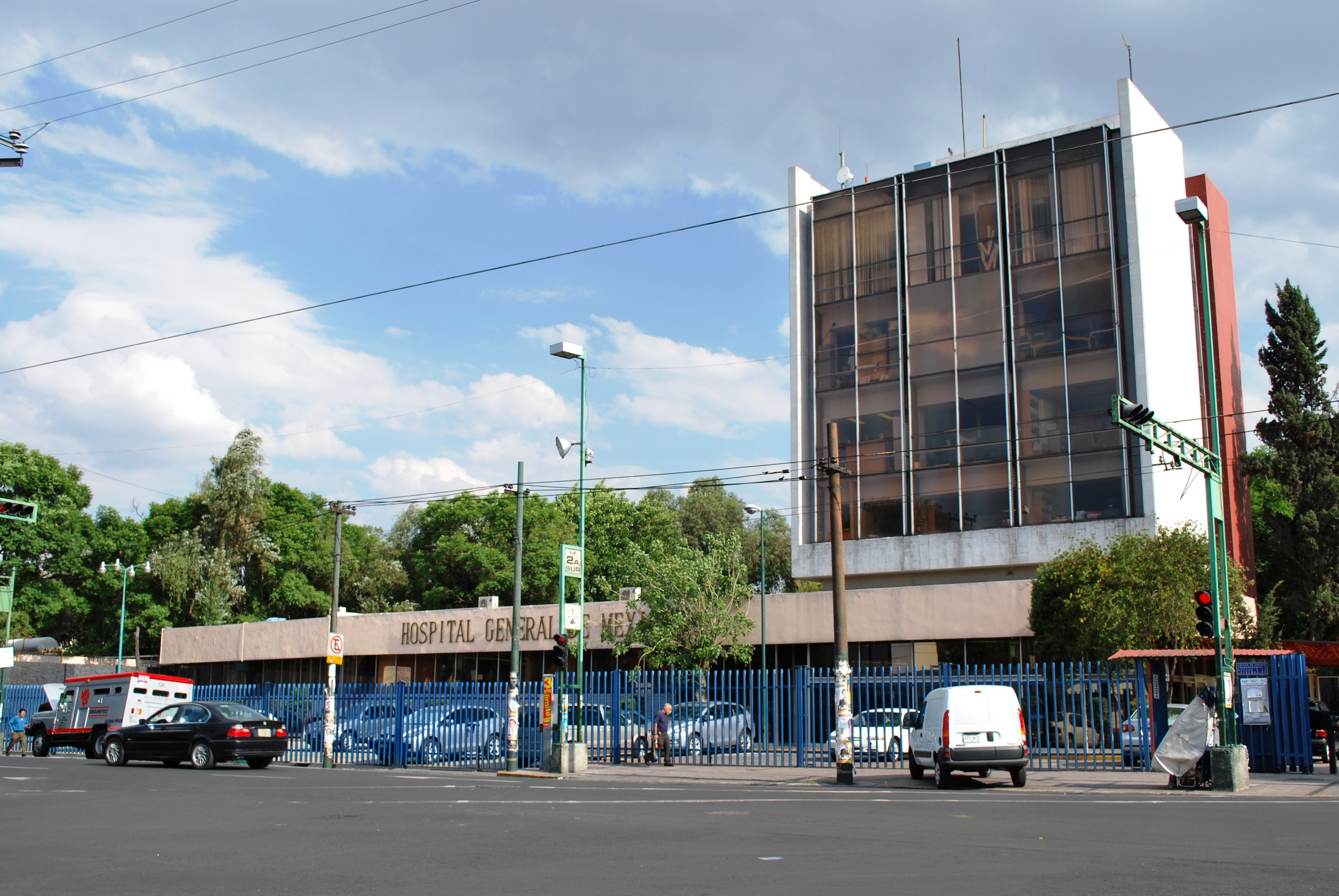
Hospital General de México, located on Dr. Balmis street near Avenida Cuauhtémoc and Metro Hospital General

=== General Hospital of Mexico ===
The General Hospital of Mexico (Hospital General de Mexico) was inaugurated on 5 February 1905 and covers seventeen hectares. Today, the hospital employs 6,000 professionals including doctors, nurses, technicians, paramedics and administrators. Each day, the hospital treats 3,000 outpatients, discharges about 112 inpatients, and performs 164 surgeries and other invasive procedures. It has 39 medical specialties in treatment, diagnostics and rehabilitation, providing care at the secondary and tertiary level.

The hospital also receives each year 1,163 medical students and 447 residents as well as 1,624 nursing students and other paramedical trainees. It is also a research hospital with 70 investigators, 27 percent of whom are members of Mexico's National System of Researchers (SNI), publishing about 158 articles each year.

=== Arena México ===
Doctores is home of Arena México, considered the "cathedral" of lucha libre, a style of professional wrestling. The arena hosts wrestling four days a week, on Sunday, Tuesday, Wednesday, and Friday. Consejo Mundial de Lucha Libre, the oldest professional wrestling promotion in the world, along with sister promotion Lucha Libre Elite, are the current tenants of the Arena México.

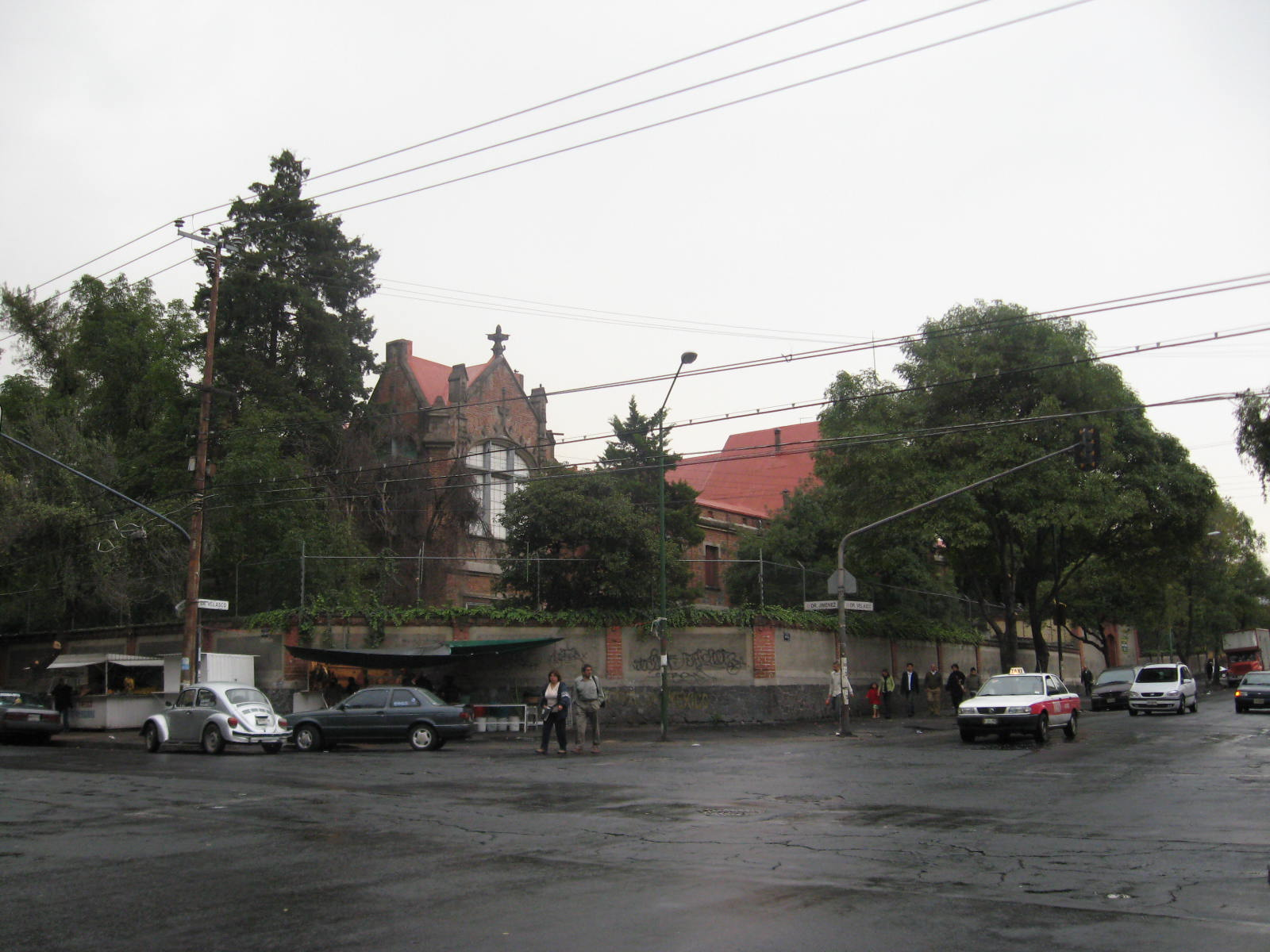
Front view of Belem from Dr. Velasco and Dr. Jiménez streets

=== Ex-Belem prison ===
The historical building of the former Belem Prison houses the present-day Instituto Maria Isabel Dunde, a preschool and primary school. It has murals by Raúl Anguiano and glasswork by Revueltas.

=== Escuela Libre de Derecho (Free School of Law) ===
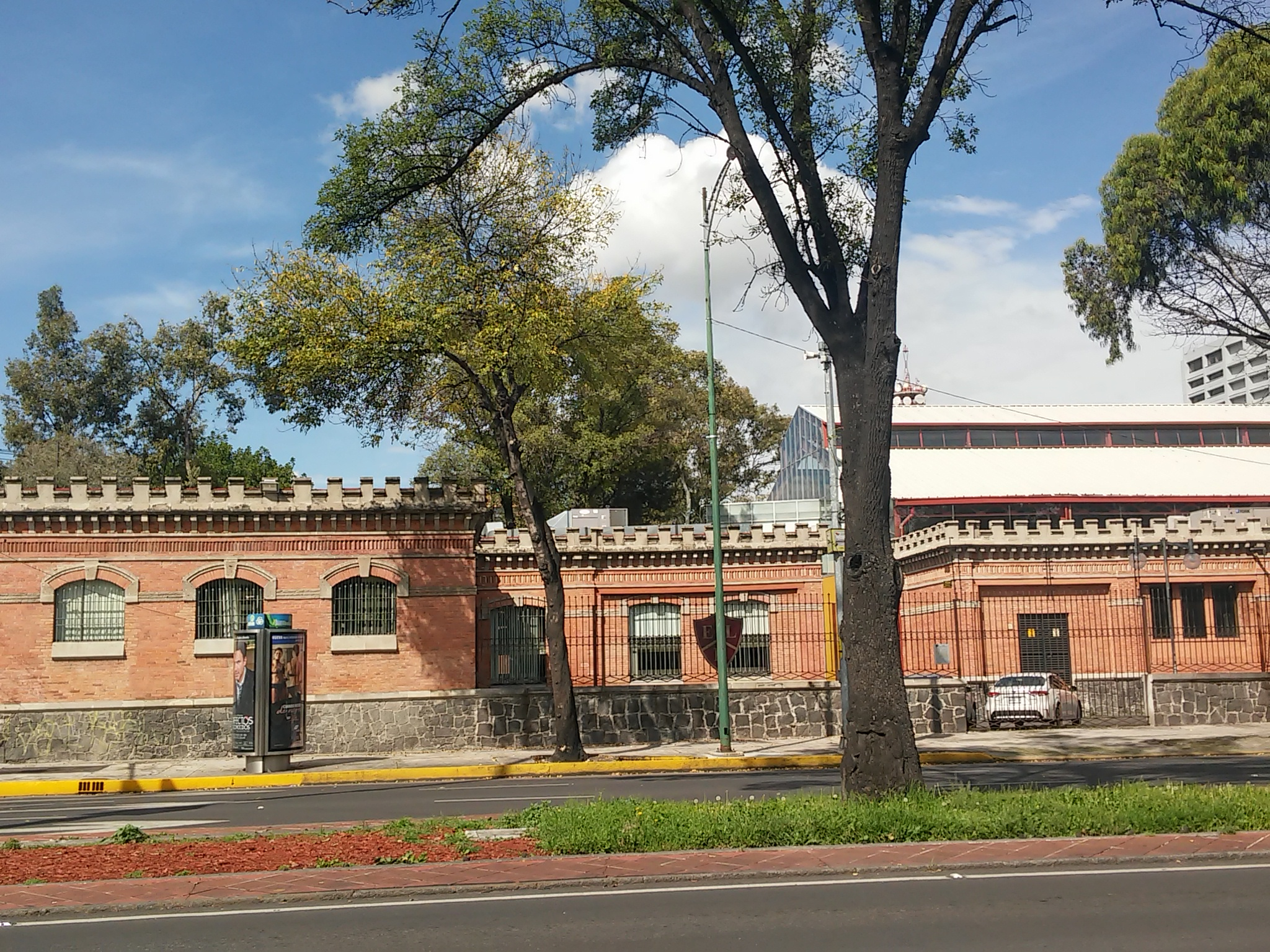
View of the Escuela Libre de Derecho from Dr. Río de la Loza Street

Located on Dr. Vértiz 12, on the corner of Arcos de Belén, it is one of the most prestigious law schools in Mexico, and second only to UNAM in age. It was founded on 14 July 1912, during a time when Mexico was in political turmoil, including student unrest against the regime of President Porfirio Díaz. It offers degrees at both the bachelor's and master's levels for those seeking careers as lawyers and other aspects of juridical science.

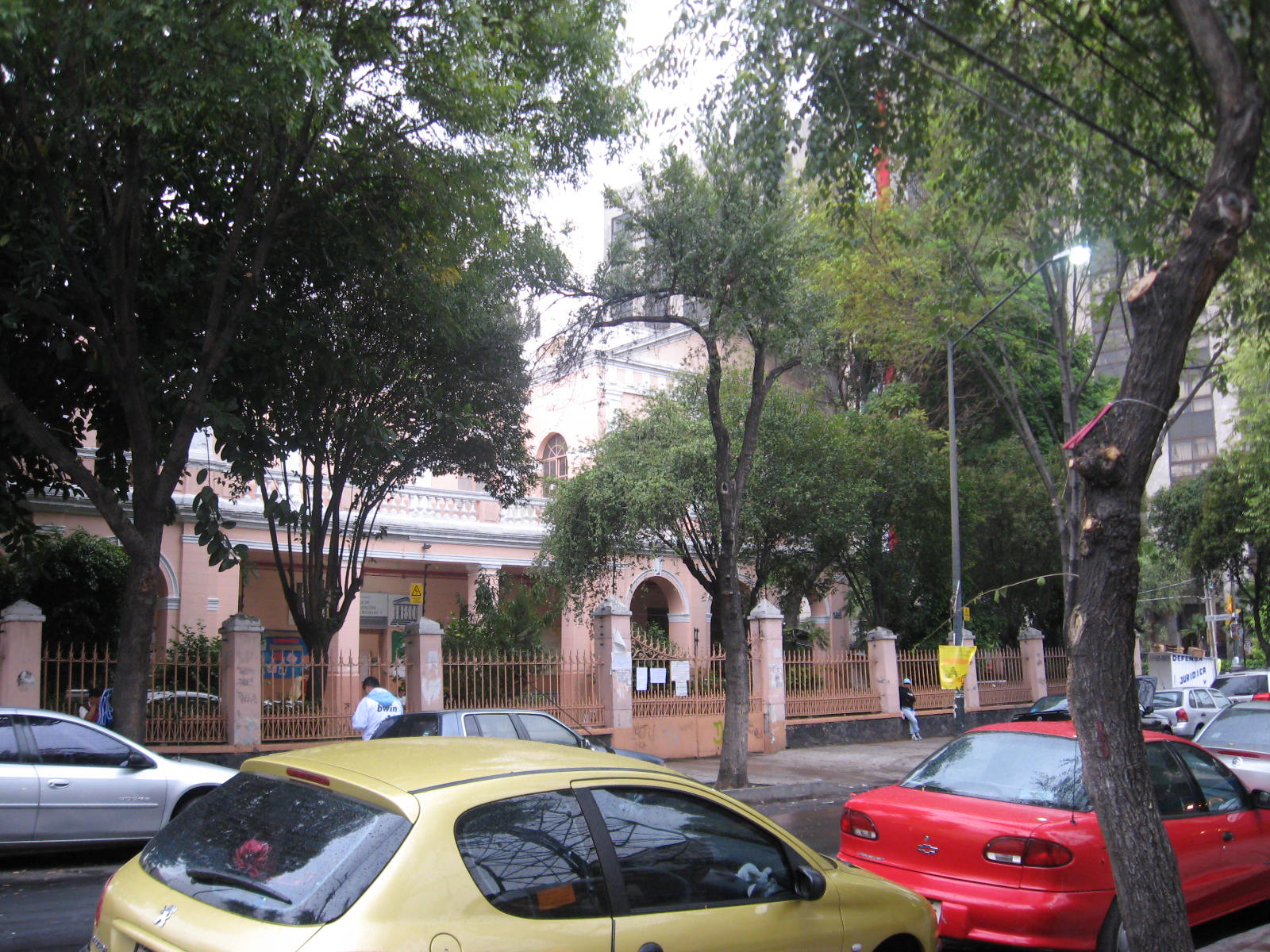
Porfirio Díaz mansion

=== Porfirio Díaz mansion ===
On Doctor Jiménez street, is an old mansion that was a wedding gift for Porfirio Díaz and his new wife doña Carmen Romero Rubio. They first used the house as a getaway as this area was just on the outskirts of the city at the time. In 1904, they decided to convert it into an educational center for working mothers and their children, known as the "Casa Amiga de la Obrera" (Friends House of the Working Woman). It is now the Escuela de Participación Social No. 1 (Social Participation School No. 1) primary school affiliated with UNESCO.

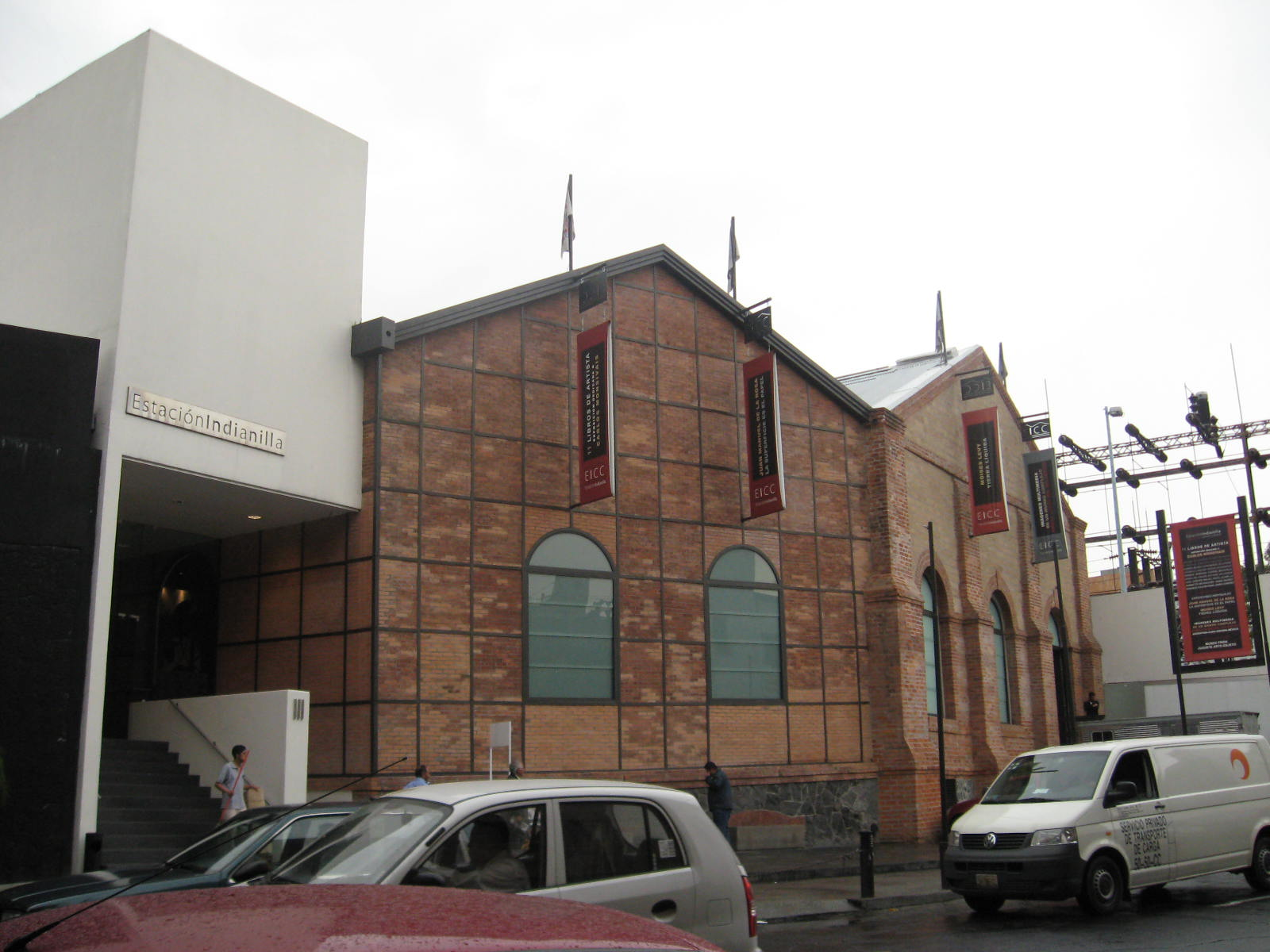
Centro Cultural Estación Indianilla

=== Centro Cultural Estación Indianilla ===
The Centro Cultural Estación Indianilla is located on Claudio Bernard Street in the colonia. This cultural center was opened in 2006 in what was an old workshop for the reparation of tram cars. The building had been in disrepair for a number of decades. It now houses exhibition space for modern and "alternative" art, taking advantage of the buildings tall ceilings and rooms built to accommodate railcars. In its basement, is the Frida de Juguete Arte Objeto Museum with pieces from artists such as Alberto Castro Leñero, Ángel Fermín Vizuet, Francisco Toledo, Gustavo Pérez, Irma Palacios, Jazz Moart and Joe Laville.

=== XXI Century National Medical Center ===
This facility was inaugurated in 1964, becoming the most important center for specialized medicine in the country. It is located on Cuauhtémoc Avenue in the far southwest corner of the colonia. The hospital houses about 30 works of art from fourteen different artists such as David Alfaro Siqueiros, Federico Cantú, Luis Nishizawa, Francisco Zúñiga, José Chávez Morado, Salvador Pinoncelly and Tosia Malamud. The 1985 Mexico City earthquake damaged many of the buildings' foundations requiring demolitions but their artworks were salvaged. The center sees the art as an integral part of the healing process. Inside the main entrance of the hospital is a mural called "Homage to rescue" by José Chávez Morado. It is 230 square meters etched in marble done between 1988 and 1999.

=== Government buildings ===
This area, especially the northern section, is home to a number of Mexico City's governmental offices, including:

- Procuraduría General de Justicia del Distrito Federal, on Gabriel Hernández Street.
- Asesoría Jurídica Laboral, on Dr. Lucio St.
- Comisión de Derechos Humanos del Distrito Federal, on Doctor Río de la Loza St.
- Instituto Electoral del Distrito Federal, on Orozco y Berra St.
- Fondo de Seguridad Pública del D.F., on Gabriel Hernández St.
- Fondo para la Atención y Apoyo a las Victimas del Delito, on Gabriel Hernández St.
- Instituto de Formación Profesional del D.F., on Gabriel Hernández St.
- Sistema de Corredores de Transporte Público de Pasajeros del Distrito Federal (Metrobús), on Av. Cuauhtémoc.

=== Transportation ===
- Balderas metro station
  - Balderas Metrobús station
- Centro Médico metro station
  - Centro Médico Metrobús station
- Doctor Márquez Metrobús station
- Doctores metro station
- Hospital General metro station
  - Hospital General Metrobús station
- Jardín Pushkin Metrobús station
- Lázaro Cárdenas metro station
- Niños Héroes / Poder Judicial CDMX metro station

== Crime and public safety ==
The area has a reputation of being high crime. It was ranked among the top 25 neighborhoods of the city for percentage of residents incarcerated, and it was ranked fourth most “dangerous” neighborhood based on the total number of reported crimes per day (not calculated per capita), behind Centro, Colonia del Valle, and Colonia Narvarte. It is also known for its large numbers of cantinas, cabarets and “hoteles de paso” (hotels with hourly rates). However, most of the crime associated with this area is related to car theft and chop shops. For example, a Hummer stolen from El Paso, Texas, was found intact on the streets here.

Colonia Doctores used to be the home to many pulquerías, bars or cantinas that serve pulque to a mostly lower-class clientele. However, in Mexico City, these establishments have been heavily regulated because they were often seen as centers of vice. Due to this, and the increasing popularity of beer, very few pulquerías still exist; a remaining example is "La Hija de los Apaches" at Dr. Lavista 186.
