= Teponaztli =

Mesoamerican slit drum

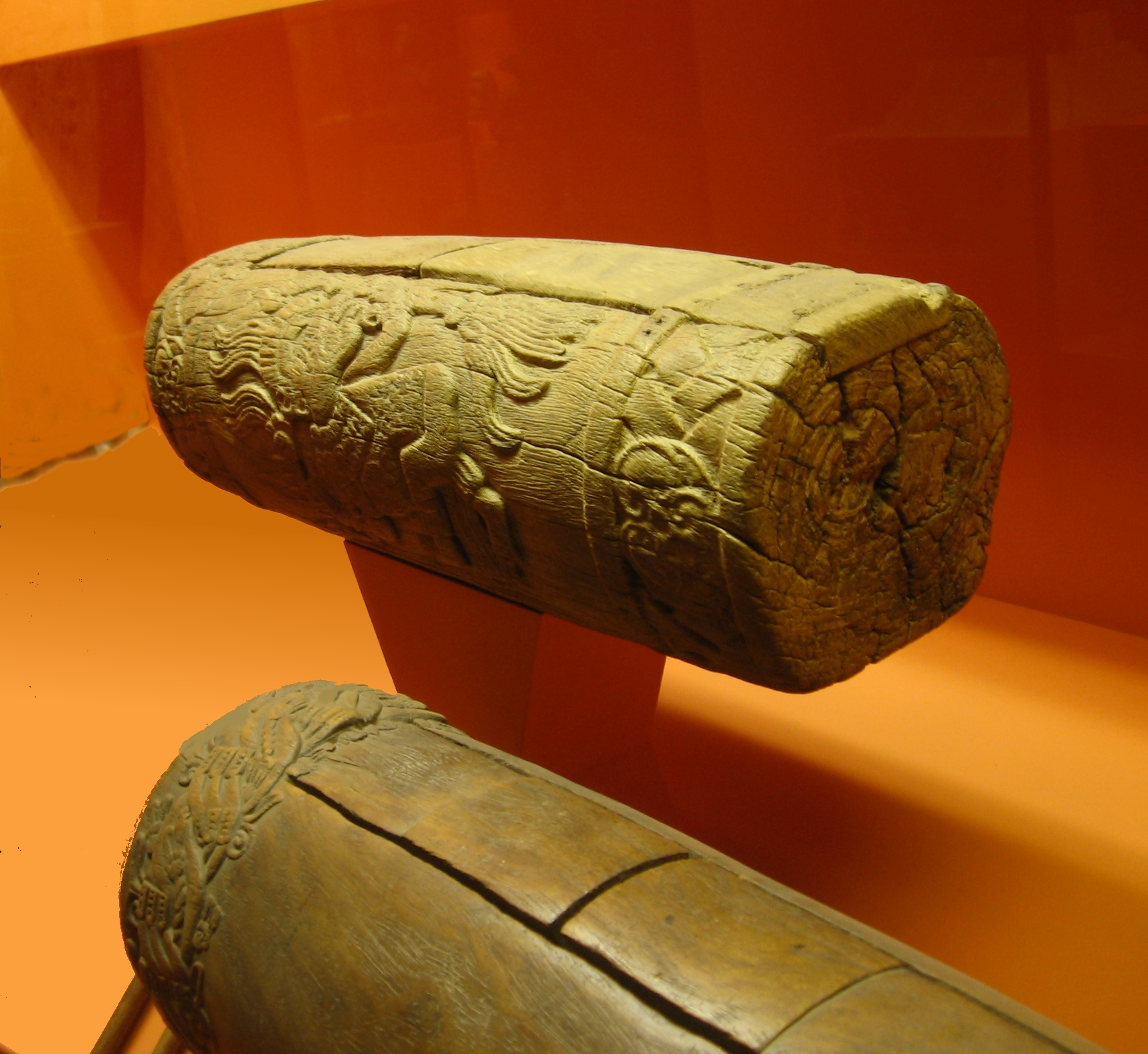
- These 2 drums in the American Museum of Natural History are approximately 2 feet (60 cm) long.

Percussion instrument
- Classification: Percussion
- Hornbostel–Sachs classification: 111.2 (Percussion idiophones)

Related instruments
- temple blocks, Log drums, muyu, wood block

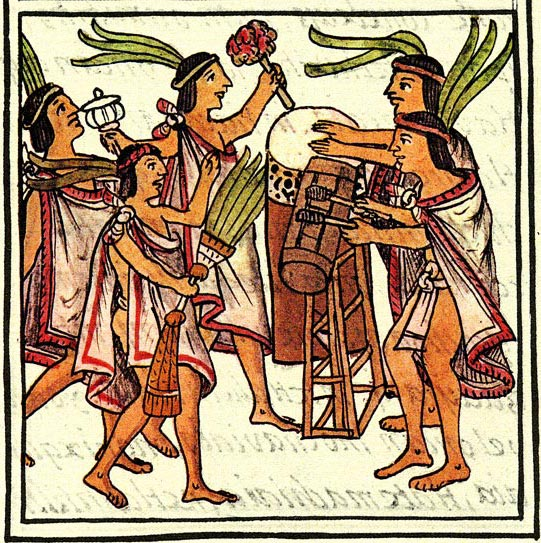
A drawing from the 16th century Florentine Codex showing a One Flower ceremony with a teponaztli (foreground) and a huehuetl (background).

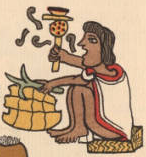
This is a type of teponaztli made out of a turtle shell or ayotapalcatl [ajotaˈpaɬkat͡ɬ]

A teponaztli [tepoˈnast͡ɬi] is a type of slit drum used in central Mexico by the Aztecs and related cultures.

== Structure ==
Teponaztli are made of hollow hardwood logs, often fire-hardened. Like most slit drums, teponaztlis have two slits on their topside, cut into the shape of an "H". The resultant strips or tongues are then struck with rubber-head wood mallets, or with deer antlers. Since the tongues are of different lengths, or carved into different thicknesses, the teponaztli produces 2 different pitches, usually near a third or fourth apart.

Teponaztli were usually decorated with relief carvings of various deities or with abstract designs, and were even carved into the shapes of creatures or humans. Some of these creatures are open-mouthed, providing increased volume through the hole at the end. On other drums, a hole was made on the drum's underside. Teponaztli from the Mixtec culture in what is today south-central Mexico are known for their various battle or mythological scenes carved in relief.

These drums ranged in size from about 1 foot (30 cm) to 4 feet (1.2 metres) long. The larger teponaztli would be rested upon a supporting frame. The smaller ones could either be rested on a frame or carried by straps about the shoulders.

== Use ==
Someone who plays a teponaztli is called a teponāzoāni [teponaːsoˈaːni] and teponaztli were used in dances, poetry, celebrations(as shown in the Florentine Codex above) or in warfare as a means of communication. According to some sources, on important state occasions the blood of sacrificial victims was at times poured into the drum.

Motolinia, a Franciscan friar and chronicler of post-conquest Aztec life, stated that the teponaztli, or as he called it the contrabajos (counterbass), was often played with the huehuetl skin drum to accompany various dances. In addition to dances, teponaztlis were used to accompanied poetry readings: the notations for the sounds of the drum beats (cuīcatlahtōl [kʷiːkaˈt͡ɬaʔtoːl]) even at times appear within the poetry itself ("totocoto tototo cototo tiquititi titiqui tiquito"). The word cuīcatlahtōl, meaning "musical note", is formed from the two words cuīcatl [ˈkʷiːkat͡ɬ] (song) and tlahtōlli [t͡ɬaʔˈtoːlːi] (word). This solfege-style notation allows reconstruction the rhythms and sounds of the Aztecs.

== Strokes ==
Each drum pattern is written using four syllables: To, Ko, Ti, Ki

Pitch:

- To and Ko: low tones
- Ti and Ki: high tones

Beat:

- To and Ti: downbeats
- Ko and Ki: upbeats

Aztec beat dedicated to the ruler Āhuitzotl [aːˈwit͡sot͡ɬ]
| high | | ♩ | | ♩ | | ♩ | ♩ | ♩ |
| low | ♫ | | ♫ | | ♫ | | | |
| name | toko | ti | toko | ti | toko | ti | ti | ti |

ancient Mayan beat called Xtoles
| high | ♫ | ♩ | ♩ | ♩ | | ♩ | ♩ | quarter rest |
| low | | | | | ♩ | | | quarter rest |
| name | tiki | ti | ti | ti | to | ti | ti | quarter pause |

Huichol deer-hunting beat from northwestern Jalisco
| high | ♩ | | ♩ | | ♩ | | ♩ | quarter rest |
| low | | ♫ | | ♫ | | ♫ | | quarter rest |
| name | ti | toko | ti | toko | ti | toko | ti | quarter pause |
