= Refinería metro station =

Mexico City metro station

Refinería
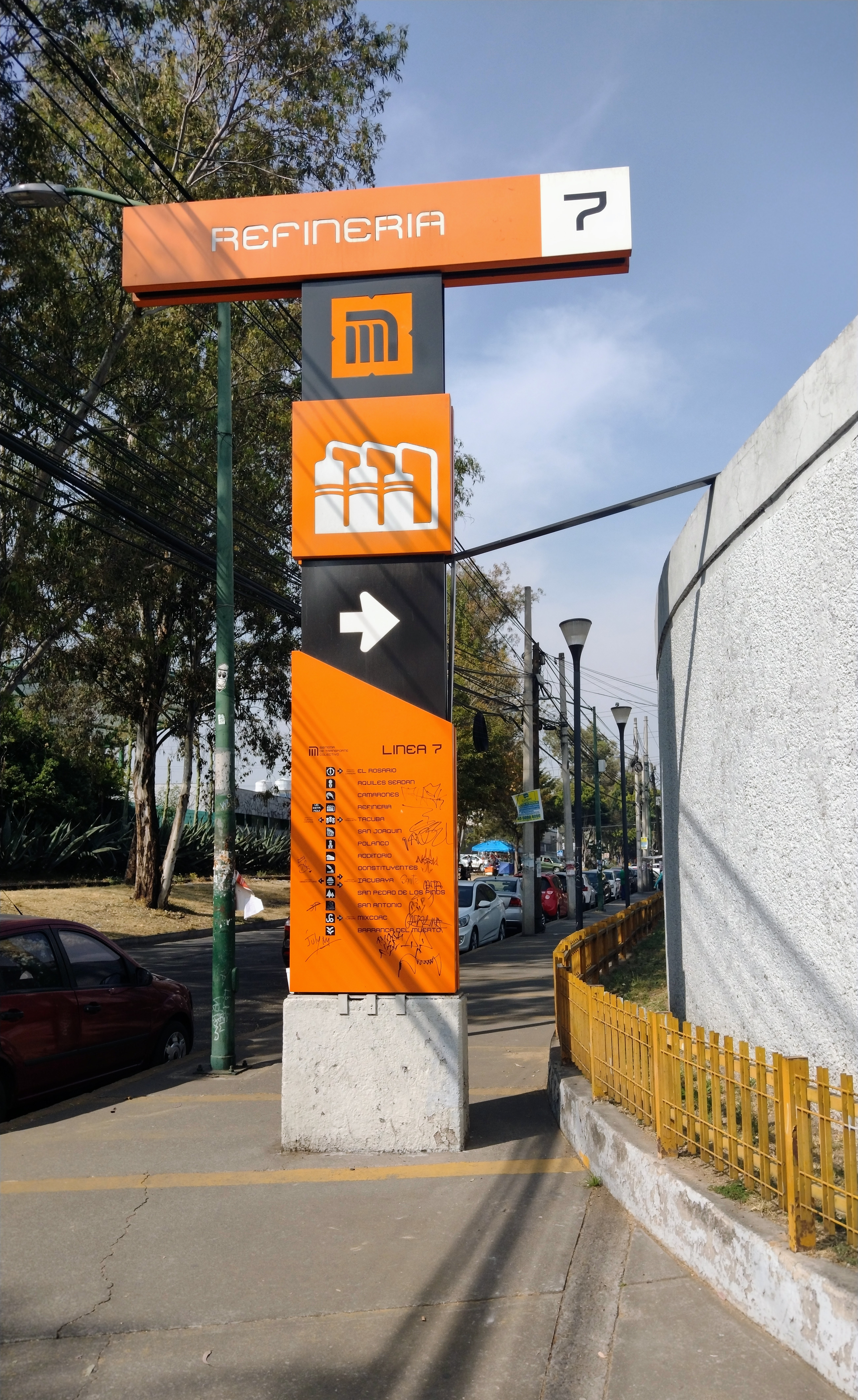

General information
- Location: Av. Ferrocarriles Nacionales; Ángel Zimbrón, Azcapotzalco; Mexico City; Mexico
- Coordinates: 19°28′12″N 99°11′26″W
- System: Mexico City Metro
- Operator: Sistema de Transporte Colectivo (STC)
- Platforms: 2 side platforms
- Tracks: 2

Construction
- Structure type: Underground

Other information
- Status: In service

History
- Opened: 29 November 1988; 37 years ago

Passengers
- 2025: 3,179,860 (Note: The data here is limited to the most recent ten years to avoid excessive listings; earlier figures can be found in this page's history or on the Mexico City Metro website. To calculate the average daily ridership, the annual total is divided by 365 days (366 in leap years), with decimals omitted from the result. Each station per line is ranked individually, as the system counts transfer stations separately. The percentage change is calculated automatically using the data from the current year and the previous year.) ▼1.82%
- Rank: 147/195

Services
Preceding station	Mexico City Metro	Following station
Camarones toward El Rosario	Line 7	Tacuba toward Barranca del Muerto
Route map
Location
- Location within Mexico City
- Area map

Refinería (Spanish: Estación Refinería) is a station along Line 7 of the metro of Mexico City. The station is located close to the Pemex 18 de marzo refinery in the Colonia Ángel Zimbrón neighborhood of the Azcapotzalco borough northwest of the city center, between the stations of Camarones and Tacuba. Its logo represents three containers of the Pemex refinery.

The station opened on 29 November 1988 as a part of the five-station northern stretch of Line 7 between Tacuba and El Rosario.

From 23 April to 17 June 2020, the station was temporarily closed due to the COVID-19 pandemic in Mexico.

== Ridership ==
Annual passenger ridership
Year	Ridership	Average daily	Rank	% change	Ref.
2025	3,179,860	8,711	147/195	−1.82%
2024	3,238,659	8,848	139/195	−29.61%
2023	4,601,169	12,605	102/195	+13.63%
2022	4,049,394	11,094	107/195	+83.56%
2021	2,206,048	6,043	133/195	+16.38%
2020	1,895,490	5,178	155/195	−52.38%
2019	3,980,593	10,905	149/195	+0.91%
2018	3,944,874	10,807	148/195	+6.08%
2017	3,718,657	10,188	148/195	−3.19%
2016	3,841,233	10,495	146/195	+11.64%

== Services and accessibility ==
It has accessibility for the disabled. It has services such as turnstiles and information screens.
