= San Antonio metro station (Mexico City) =

Mexico City metro station

San Antonio

General information
- Location: Avenida Revolución; Nonoalco, Benito Juárez; Mexico City; Mexico
- Coordinates: 19°23′05″N 99°11′11″W
- System: Mexico City Metro
- Operator: Sistema de Transporte Colectivo (STC)
- Platforms: 2 side platforms
- Tracks: 2

Construction
- Structure type: Underground
- Parking: No
- Cycle facilities: No
- Accessible: Partial

Other information
- Status: In service

History
- Opened: 19 December 1985; 40 years ago

Passengers
- 2025: 3,979,989 (Note: The data here is limited to the most recent ten years to avoid excessive listings; earlier figures can be found in this page's history or on the Mexico City Metro website. To calculate the average daily ridership, the annual total is divided by 365 days (366 in leap years), with decimals omitted from the result. Each station per line is ranked individually, as the system counts transfer stations separately. The percentage change is calculated automatically using the data from the current year and the previous year.) ▲0.28%
- Rank: 133/195

Services
Preceding station	Mexico City Metro	Following station
San Pedro de los Pinos toward El Rosario	Line 7	Mixcoac toward Barranca del Muerto
Route map
Location
- Location within Mexico City
- Area map

San Antonio is a metro station on Line 7 of the Mexico City Metro. It is located in the Benito Juárez borough. In 2019, the station had an average ridership of 14,502 passengers per day.

== Name and pictogram ==
The station is located on the intersection of Avenida San Antonio and Avenida Revolución, close to the Periférico freeway, from which it takes its name. The station's pictogram depicts the outline of Saint Anthony of Padua and a child, representing innocence.

== History ==
The station opened on 19 December 1985 as part of the third stretch of Line 7, going from Tacubaya to Barranca del Muerto, the latter station being the southern terminus of the line.

From 23 April to 17 June 2020, the station was temporarily closed due to the COVID-19 pandemic in Mexico.

== General information ==
San Antonio serves the San Pedro de los Pinos and Santa María Nonoalco neighborhoods. It is also possible to reach the Estadio Azul and the Plaza de Toros México bullring from the station, which is around 1 km away from the sports facilities.

=== Ridership ===
Annual passenger ridership
Year	Ridership	Average daily	Rank	% change	Ref.
2025	3,979,989	10,904	133/195	+0.28%
2024	3,968,985	10,844	122/195	+23.72%
2023	3,208,052	8,789	128/195	+5.54%
2022	3,039,785	8,328	130/195	+25.11%
2021	2,429,723	6,656	124/195	−5.37%
2020	2,567,517	7,015	134/195	−51.50%
2019	5,293,530	14,502	124/195	−7.20%
2018	5,704,256	15,628	114/195	+2.41%
2017	5,569,895	15,259	114/195	−0.49%
2016	5,597,161	15,292	117/195	+3.76%

== Nearby ==
- Estadio Azul, sports facility.
- Plaza de Toros México, bullring.

== Services andaccessibility ==
The station has accessibility for the disabled. It has services such as turnstiles and information screens.

== Exits ==
- West: Av. San Antonio and Av. Revolución, Nonoalco
- East: Av. Revolución and Tintoreto, Nonoalco

== Gallery ==
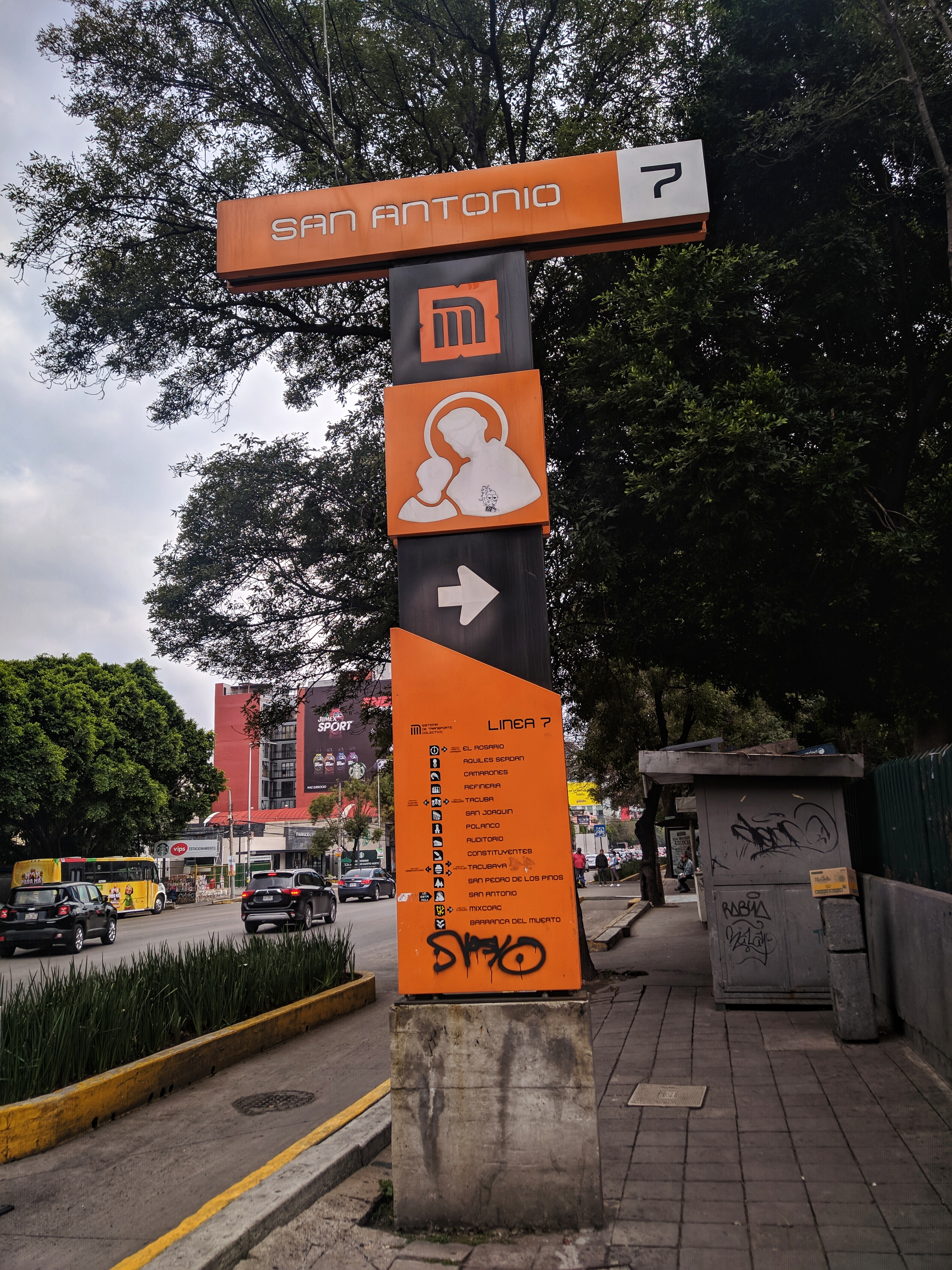
Entry sign
