= San Pedro de los Pinos metro station =

Mexico City metro station

San Pedro de los Pinos
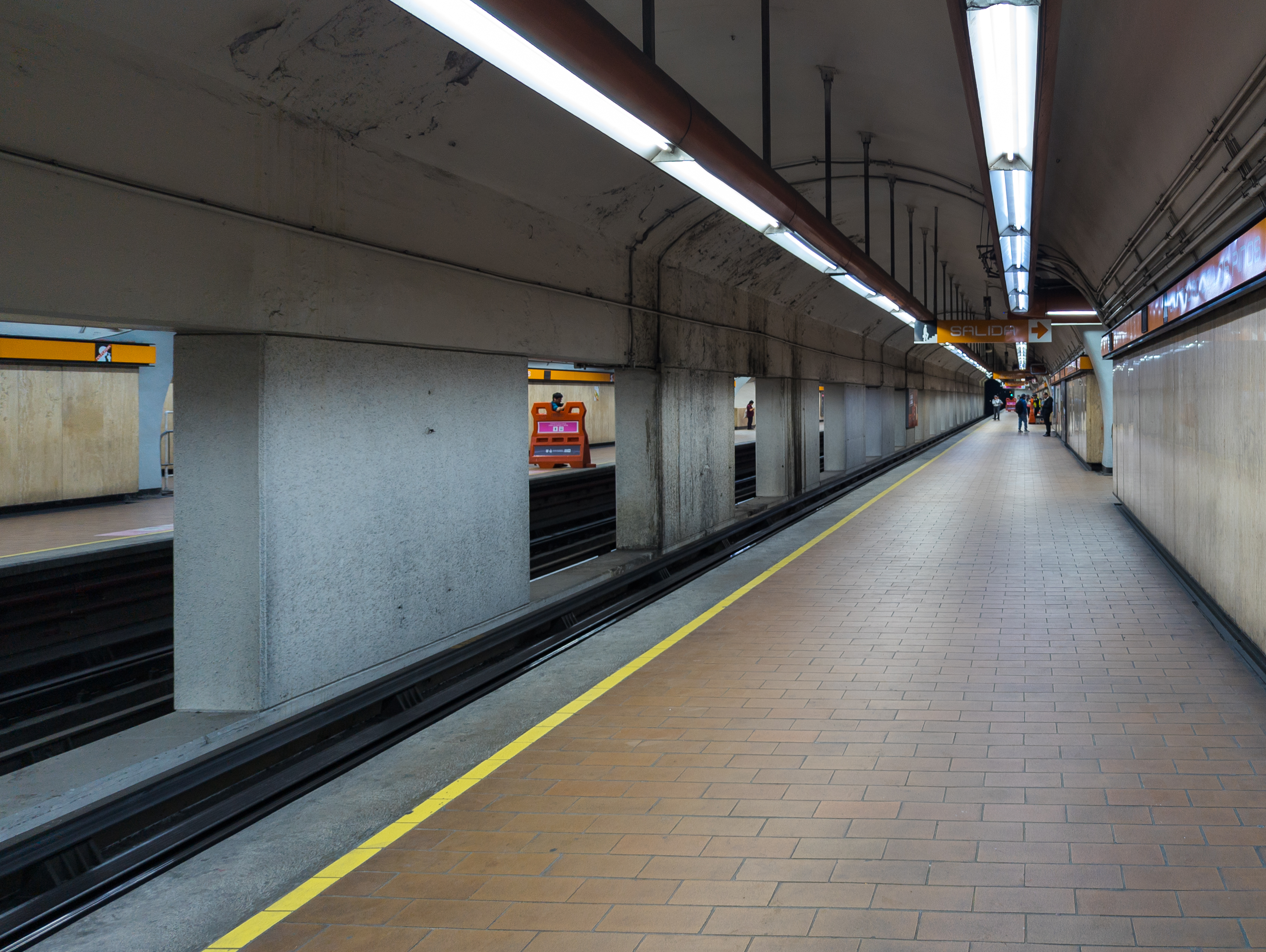
- Station in March 2026

General information
- Location: Avenida Revolución; San Pedro de los Pinos, Benito Juárez; Mexico City; Mexico
- Coordinates: 19°23′29″N 99°11′10″W
- System: Mexico City Metro
- Operator: Sistema de Transporte Colectivo (STC)
- Platforms: 2 side platforms
- Tracks: 2

Construction
- Structure type: Underground
- Accessible: Partial

Other information
- Status: In service

History
- Opened: 19 December 1985; 40 years ago

Passengers
- 2025: 3,613,572 (Note: The data here is limited to the most recent ten years to avoid excessive listings; earlier figures can be found in this page's history or on the Mexico City Metro website. To calculate the average daily ridership, the annual total is divided by 365 days (366 in leap years), with decimals omitted from the result. Each station per line is ranked individually, as the system counts transfer stations separately. The percentage change is calculated automatically using the data from the current year and the previous year.) ▲2.27%
- Rank: 138/195

Services
Preceding station	Mexico City Metro	Following station
Tacubaya toward El Rosario	Line 7	San Antonio toward Barranca del Muerto
Route map
Location
- Location within Mexico City
- Area map

San Pedro de los Pinos is a station on Line 7 of the Mexico City Metro system. It is located in the Benito Juárez municipality of Mexico City, west of the city centre. In 2019, the station had an average ridership of 13,680 passengers per day.

== Name and pictogram ==
The station is named for the neighborhood it serves: San Pedro de los Pinos. During 17th and 18th century, several ranches and haciendas were established in this area, as well as a bartizan, the bartizan of San Pedro, which was in the middle of the route going from the center of Mexico City towards Mixcoac or San Ángel in the south. The soil here was very fertile, thus, having plenty of groves, mainly pines. Hence the name San Pedro de los Pinos.

Therefore, the station's pictogram features a silhouette of two pine trees, as "pinos" means pines in Spanish.

== General information ==
The station opened on 19 December 1985 as part of Line 7's third stretch, going from Tacubaya to Barranca del Muerto, the southern terminus of the line.

The station serves the San Pedro de los Pinos neighborhood.

=== Exits ===
- East: Avenida Revolución and Calle 9, San Pedro de los Pinos
- West: Avenida Revolución and Calle 4, San Pedro de los Pinos

=== Ridership ===
Annual passenger ridership
Year	Ridership	Average daily	Rank	% Change	Ref.
2025	3,748,381	10,269	138/195	+2.27%
2024	3,665,312	10,014	133/195	+1.43%
2023	3,613,572	9,900	121/195	+18.97%
2022	3,037,282	8,321	121/195	+26.60%
2021	2,399,129	6,572	127/195	−11.65%
2020	2,715,374	7,419	130/195	−45.62%
2019	4,993,274	13,680	131/195	+1.79%
2018	4,905,337	13,439	128/195	+2.73%
2017	4,775,143	13,083	127/195	−5.83%
2016	5,070,899	13,854	124/195	+2.48%

== Services and Accessibility ==
It has accessibility for the disabled. It has services such as turnstiles and information screens.

== Gallery ==
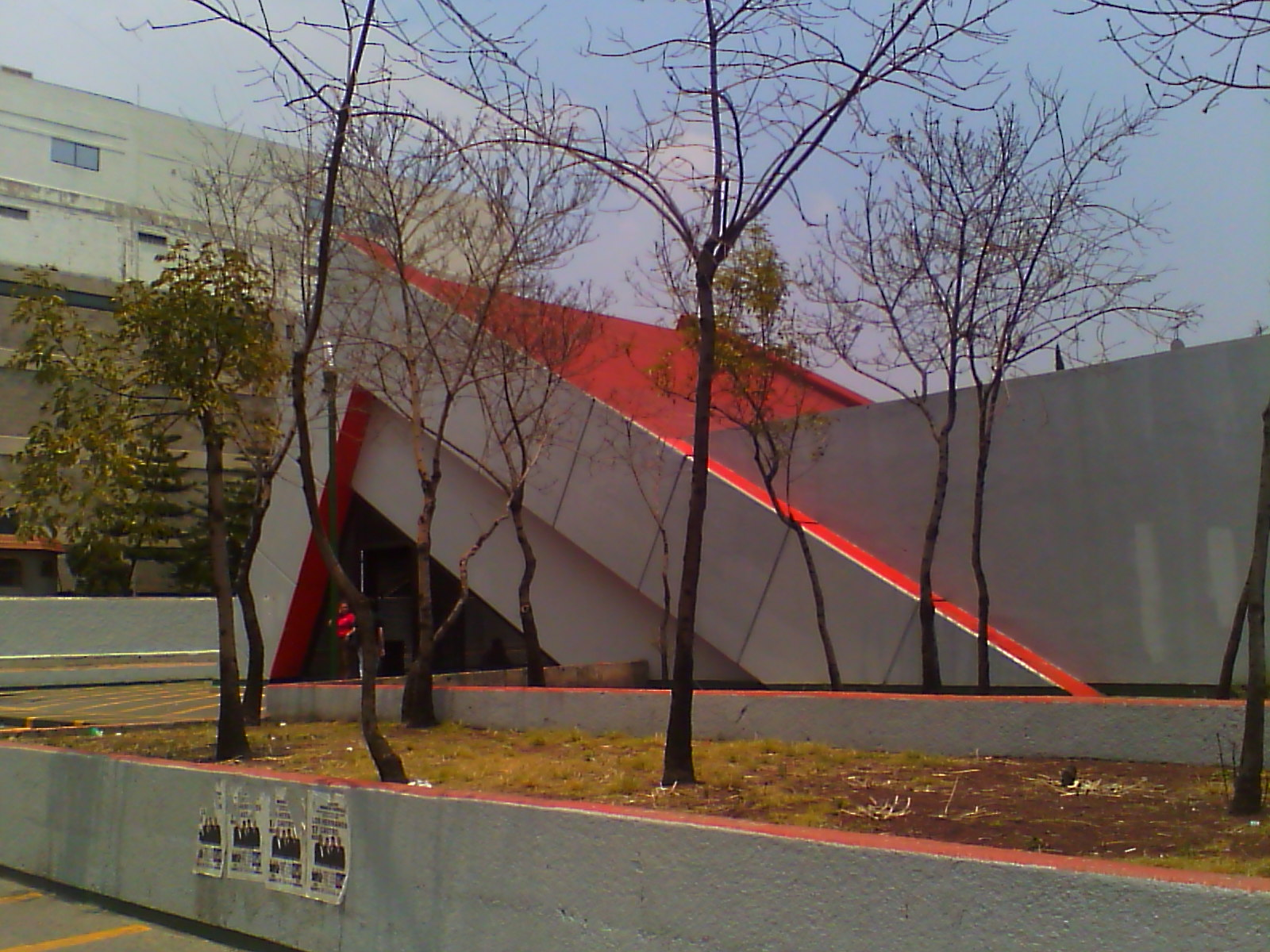
Entrance to the station
