= Auditorio metro station =

Mexico City metro station

Auditorio
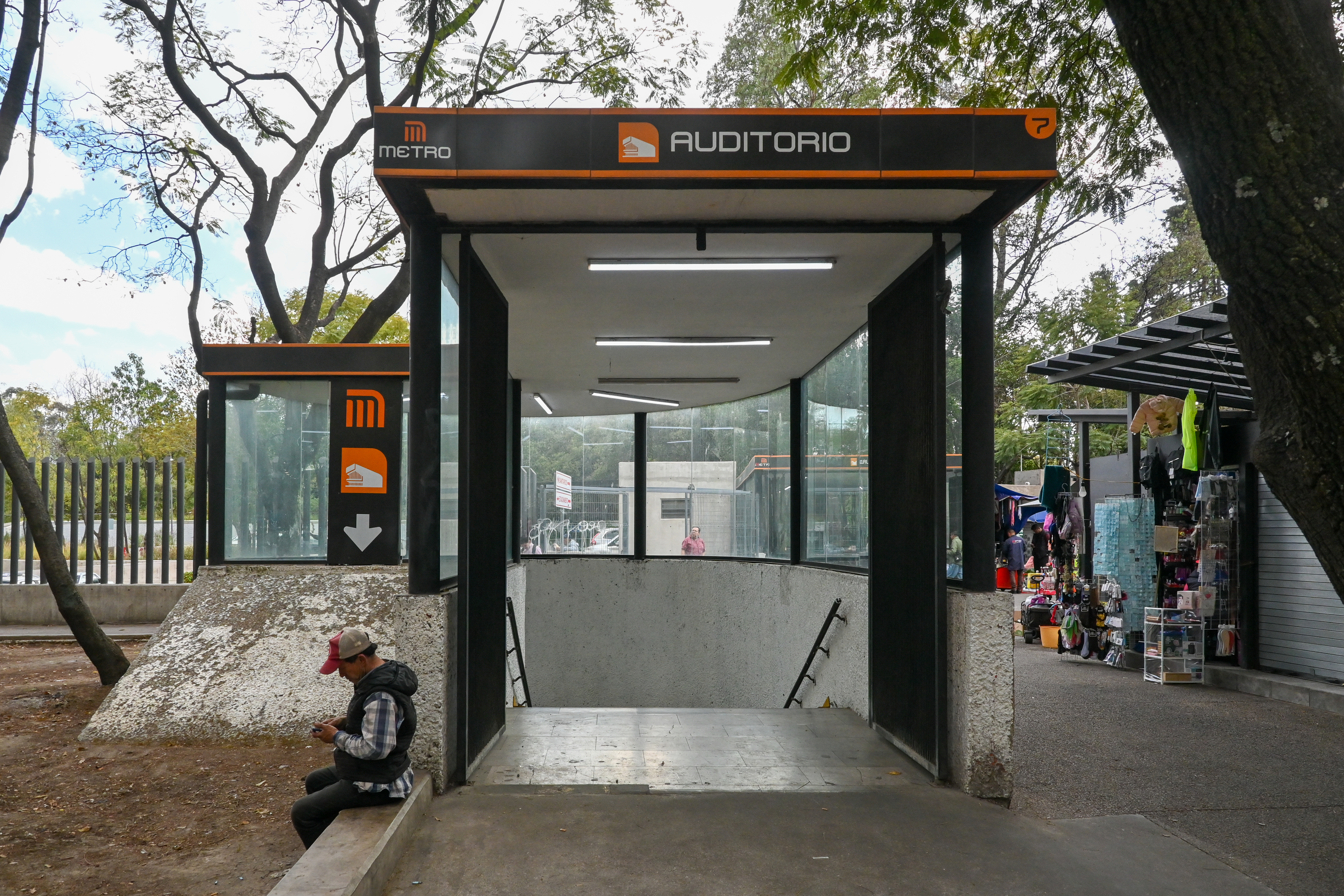
- Auditorio station's entrance

General information
- Location: Paseo de la Reforma; Polanco, Miguel Hidalgo; Mexico City; Mexico
- Coordinates: 19°25′32″N 99°11′31″W
- System: Mexico City Metro
- Operator: Sistema de Transporte Colectivo (STC)
- Platforms: 2 side platforms
- Tracks: 2
- Connections: Auditorio

Construction
- Structure type: Underground
- Platform levels: 1
- Parking: No
- Cycle facilities: No
- Accessible: Yes

Other information
- Status: In service

History
- Opened: 20 December 1984; 41 years ago

Key dates
- 28 December 2025; 7 months ago: Temporarily closed
- 17 May 2026; 3 months ago: Reopened

Passengers
- 2025: 11,247,139 (Note: The data here is limited to the most recent ten years to avoid excessive listings; earlier figures can be found in this page's history or on the Mexico City Metro website. To calculate the average daily ridership, the annual total is divided by 365 days (366 in leap years), with decimals omitted from the result. Each station per line is ranked individually, as the system counts transfer stations separately. The percentage change is calculated automatically using the data from the current year and the previous year.) ▼3.34%
- Rank: 21/195

Services
| Preceding station | Mexico City Metro | Following station |
|---|---|---|
| Polanco toward El Rosario | Line 7 | Constituyentes toward Barranca del Muerto |
Route map
Location
- Location within Mexico City
- Area map

Auditorio (Spanish: Estación Auditorio) is a Mexico City Metro station located on line 7. It is one of the main metro gateways (along with Metro Polanco) to the chic and business-related neighborhood, Polanco. The entrances to the station are on Paseo de la Reforma, one of the main thoroughfares in Mexico City.

Its symbol depicts the façade of the Auditorio Nacional (English: National Auditorium), which is just above the station. The auditorium is one of the main venues for concerts, shows and entertainment in the city, so almost every weekend night, this station is used by the attendants to the events. The station opened on 20 December 1984.

== General information ==
This station is also frequently used by tourists because of its proximity to many landmarks of the city, such as Chapultepec, the Voladores de Papantla, Museo Tamayo and the Museo Nacional de Antropología. Outside the station, just in front of the Auditorio Nacional, is the main station of the Turibus, a double-deck bus that runs a touristic route that goes from Chapultepec Park to the Historic Center along Reforma.

During weekdays, this station is also one of the busiest ones of the network because it is an entrance to the business, office and financial area in Polanco. Outside the station there is also one of the main microbus stops in the area; these microbuses transport people coming from the metro to other business and commercial zones in the city like northern Polanco, Palmas, Santa Fe, Lomas de Chapultepec and Satélite.

During rush hour, due to the large mass of people taking these buses outside the metro station and to the poor infrastructure of the microbus stops, heavy traffic is originated in this part of Paseo de la Reforma. Criticism has also been made to the layout of this metro station (among others of Line 7) because the heavy flows of people are not well managed; during rush hours flows of people walking in different directions often face each other causing a decrease in the speed of pedestrian traffic. Other problems concern the bottlenecks at bridges, narrow tunnels, escalators, and normal stairs due to low capacity.

=== Ridership ===
Annual passenger ridership
| Year | Ridership | Average daily | Rank | % change | Ref. |
|---|---|---|---|---|---|
| 2025 | 11,247,139 | 30,814 | 21/195 | −3.34% |
| 2024 | 11,636,000 | 31,792 | 16/195 | +16.18% |
| 2023 | 10,015,327 | 27,439 | 25/195 | +22.15% |
| 2022 | 8,199,311 | 22,463 | 32/195 | +49.77% |
| 2021 | 5,474,627 | 14,998 | 41/195 | +0.90% |
| 2020 | 5,425,779 | 14,824 | 51/195 | −56.61% |
| 2019 | 12,503,639 | 34,256 | 29/195 | +6.92% |
| 2018 | 11,693,911 | 32,038 | 37/195 | −3.32% |
| 2017 | 12,096,093 | 33,139 | 31/195 | −1.00% |
| 2016 | 12,218,504 | 33,383 | 33/195 | +6.06% |

== Nearby ==
- Auditorio Nacional, concert and entertainment venue.
- Campo Marte, equestrian and military facility.
- Bosque de Chapultepec, city park and zoo.
- Centro Cultural del Bosque, theater.
- Jardín Winston Churchill, small garden and park which includes a statue of Winston Churchill.
- National Museum of Anthropology, the largest and most visited museum of Mexico
