= Aquiles Serdán metro station =

Mexico City metro station

Aquiles Serdán
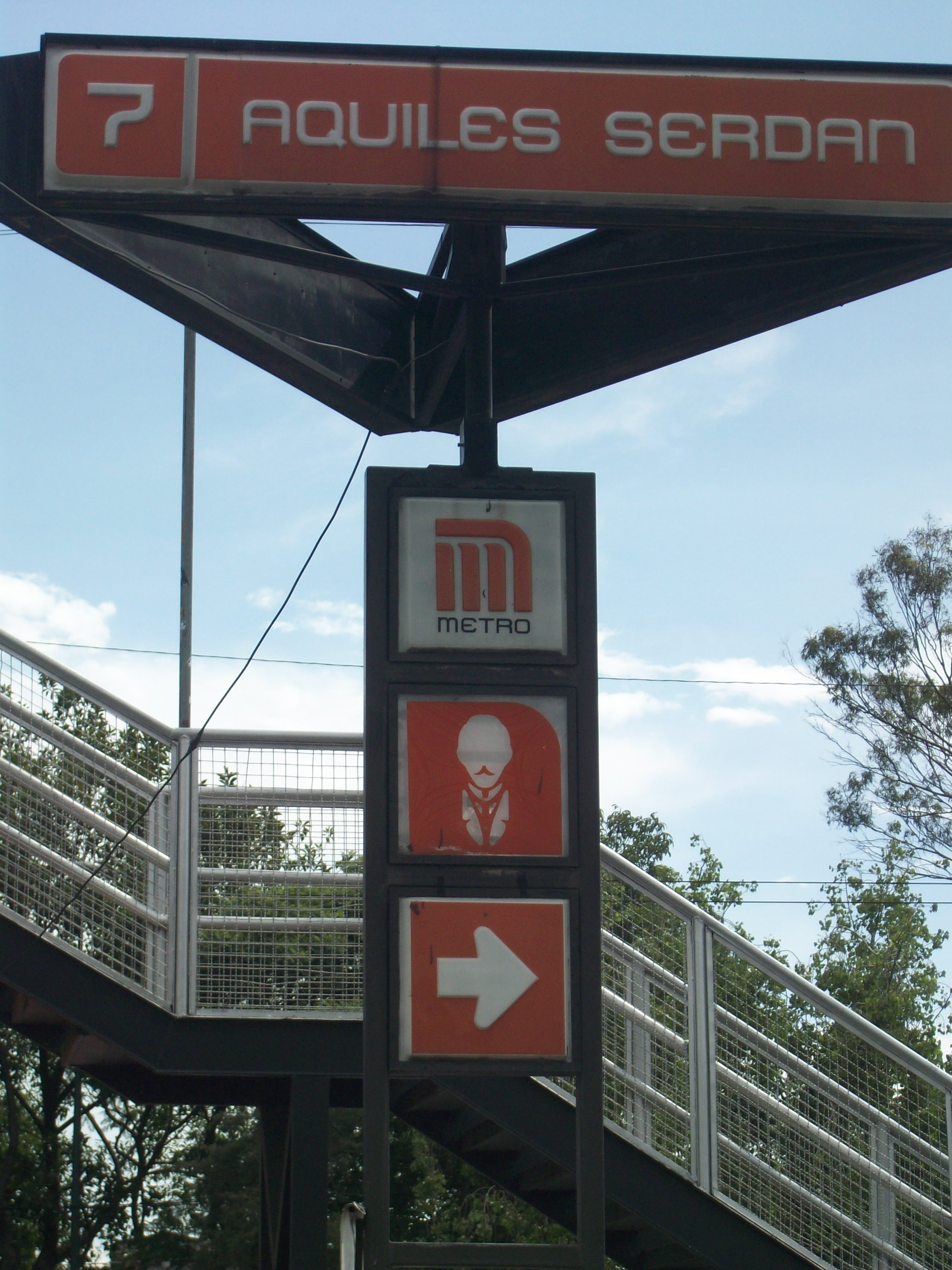

General information
- Location: Av. Aquiles Serdán; Pasteros, Azcapotzalco; Mexico City; Mexico
- Coordinates: 19°29′26″N 99°11′42″W
- System: Mexico City Metro
- Operator: Sistema de Transporte Colectivo (STC)
- Platforms: 2 side platforms
- Tracks: 2

Construction
- Structure type: Underground

Other information
- Status: In service

History
- Opened: 29 November 1988; 37 years ago

Passengers
- 2025: 4,267,643 (Note: The data here is limited to the most recent ten years to avoid excessive listings; earlier figures can be found in this page's history or on the Mexico City Metro website. To calculate the average daily ridership, the annual total is divided by 365 days (366 in leap years), with decimals omitted from the result. Each station per line is ranked individually, as the system counts transfer stations separately. The percentage change is calculated automatically using the data from the current year and the previous year.) ▲1.38%
- Rank: 124/195

Services
Preceding station	Mexico City Metro	Following station
El Rosario Terminus	Line 7	Camarones toward Barranca del Muerto
Route map
Location
- Location within Mexico City
- Area map

Aquiles Serdán (Spanish: Estación Aquiles Serdán) is a station along Line 7 of the Mexico City Metro. It is located in the Colonia La Preciosa neighborhood of the Azcapotzalco borough of northwestern Mexico City.

== General information ==
The station opened on 29 November 1988.

=== Name and iconography ===
Its logo represents the bust of Aquiles Serdán, a martyr in the Mexican Revolution.

=== Ridership ===
Annual passenger ridership
Year	Ridership	Average daily	Rank	% change	Ref.
2025	4,267,643	11,692	124/195	+1.38%
2024	4,209,686	11,501	119/195	+14.59%
2023	3,673,686	10,064	120/195	+19.32%
2022	3,078,753	8,434	129/195	+39.98%
2021	2,199,473	6,025	134/195	−26.52%
2020	2,993,225	8,178	116/195	−48.26%
2019	5,785,502	15,850	114/195	−0.31%
2018	5,803,378	15,899	112/195	+0.66%
2017	5,765,053	15,794	112/195	−4.82%
2016	6,057,188	16,549	109/195	+7.91%

=== Services and accessibility ===
The station Aquiles Serdán has accessibility for the disabled. It has services such as turnstiles and information screens.
