= Camarones metro station =

Mexico City metro station

Camarones
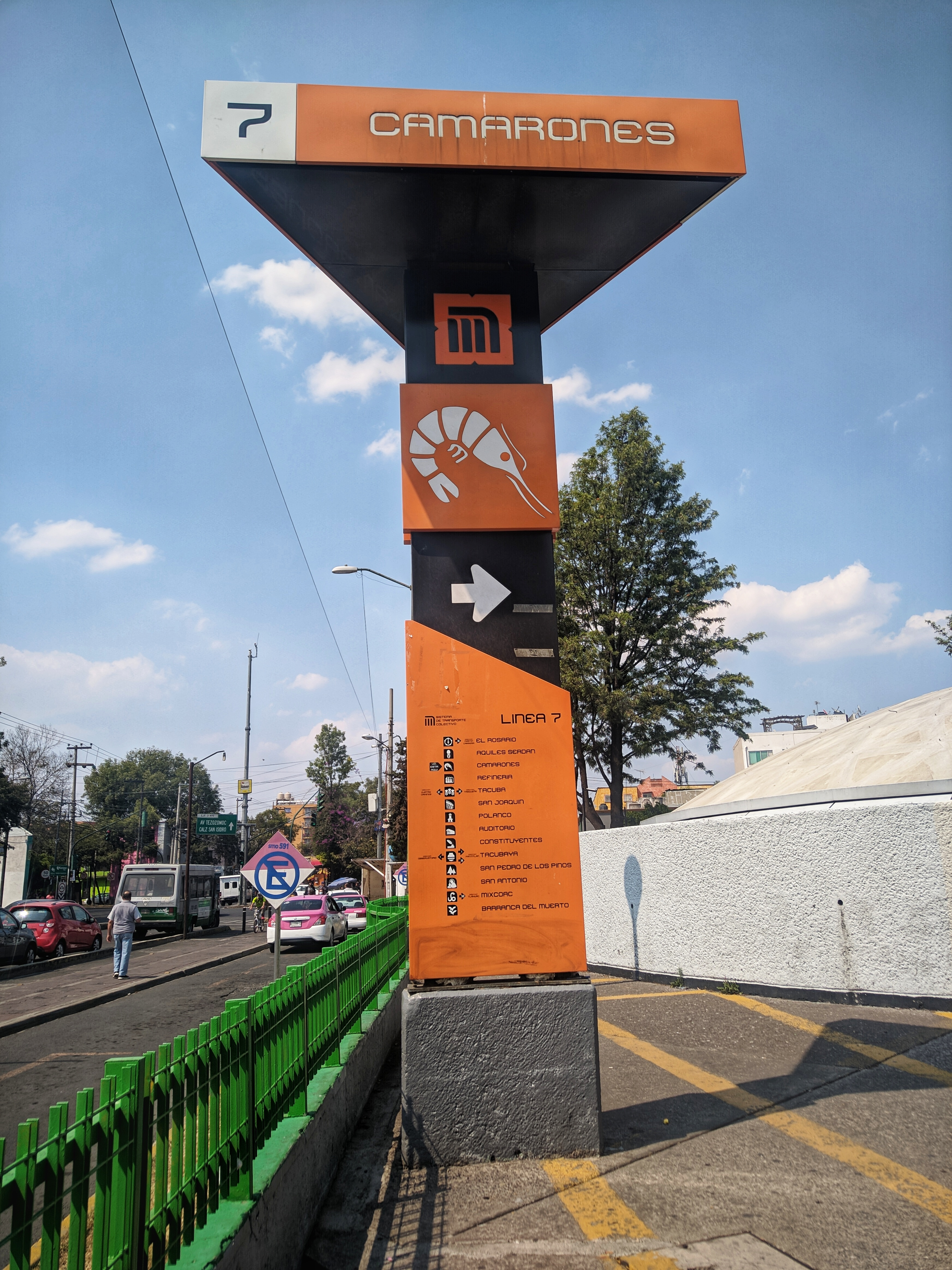

General information
- Location: Av. Ferrocarriles Nacionales; San Francisco Tetecala, Azcapotzalco; Mexico City; Mexico
- Coordinates: 19°28′45″N 99°11′24″W
- System: Mexico City Metro
- Operator: Sistema de Transporte Colectivo (STC)
- Platforms: 2 side platforms
- Tracks: 2

Construction
- Structure type: Underground
- Depth: 25 m (82 ft)

Other information
- Status: In service

History
- Opened: 29 November 1988; 37 years ago

Passengers
- 2025: 4,352,213 (Note: The data here is limited to the most recent ten years to avoid excessive listings; earlier figures can be found in this page's history or on the Mexico City Metro website. To calculate the average daily ridership, the annual total is divided by 365 days (366 in leap years), with decimals omitted from the result. Each station per line is ranked individually, as the system counts transfer stations separately. The percentage change is calculated automatically using the data from the current year and the previous year.) ▼0.02%
- Rank: 121/195

Services
Preceding station	Mexico City Metro	Following station
Aquiles Serdán toward El Rosario	Line 7	Refinería toward Barranca del Muerto
Route map
Location
- Location within Mexico City
- Area map

Camarones is a station along Line 7 of the Mexico City Metro. It is located in Colonia Barrio Santa Cruz Acayucan district in the Azcapotzalco borough, north of Mexico City, Mexico. The station was opened with the others along the northern portion of Line 7 on 29 November 1988.

Its name and logo come from a town that once existed nearby, the town of Camarones. Camarón means shrimp, a name given because the adjoining river was home to a plentiful species of shrimp, known locally as Acociles (Cambarellus montezumae), which were part of the prehispanic, colonial and early 20th century diet of the inhabitants of Mexico City. Near Camarones metro station is the Mexico City oil refinery. It also connects with trolleybus line I, which runs between Metro Chapultepec and Metro El Rosario.

== Ridership ==
Annual passenger ridership
Year	Ridership	Average daily	Rank	% change	Ref.
2025	4,352,213	11,923	121/195	−0.02%
2024	4,352,893	11,893	114/195	+12.50%
2023	3,869,116	10,600	114/195	−2.19%
2022	3,955,844	10,837	108/195	+30.91%
2021	3,021,762	8,278	107/195	−3.10%
2020	3,118,407	8,520	114/195	−45.26%
2019	5,697,048	15,608	116/195	+0.04%
2018	5,694,915	15,602	115/195	+7.74%
2017	5,285,813	14,481	119/195	−4.04%
2016	5,508,612	15,050	119/195	+0.10%

== Services and accessibility ==
It has accessibility for the disabled. It has services such as turnstiles and information screens.
