= Polanco metro station =

Mexico City Metro station

Polanco
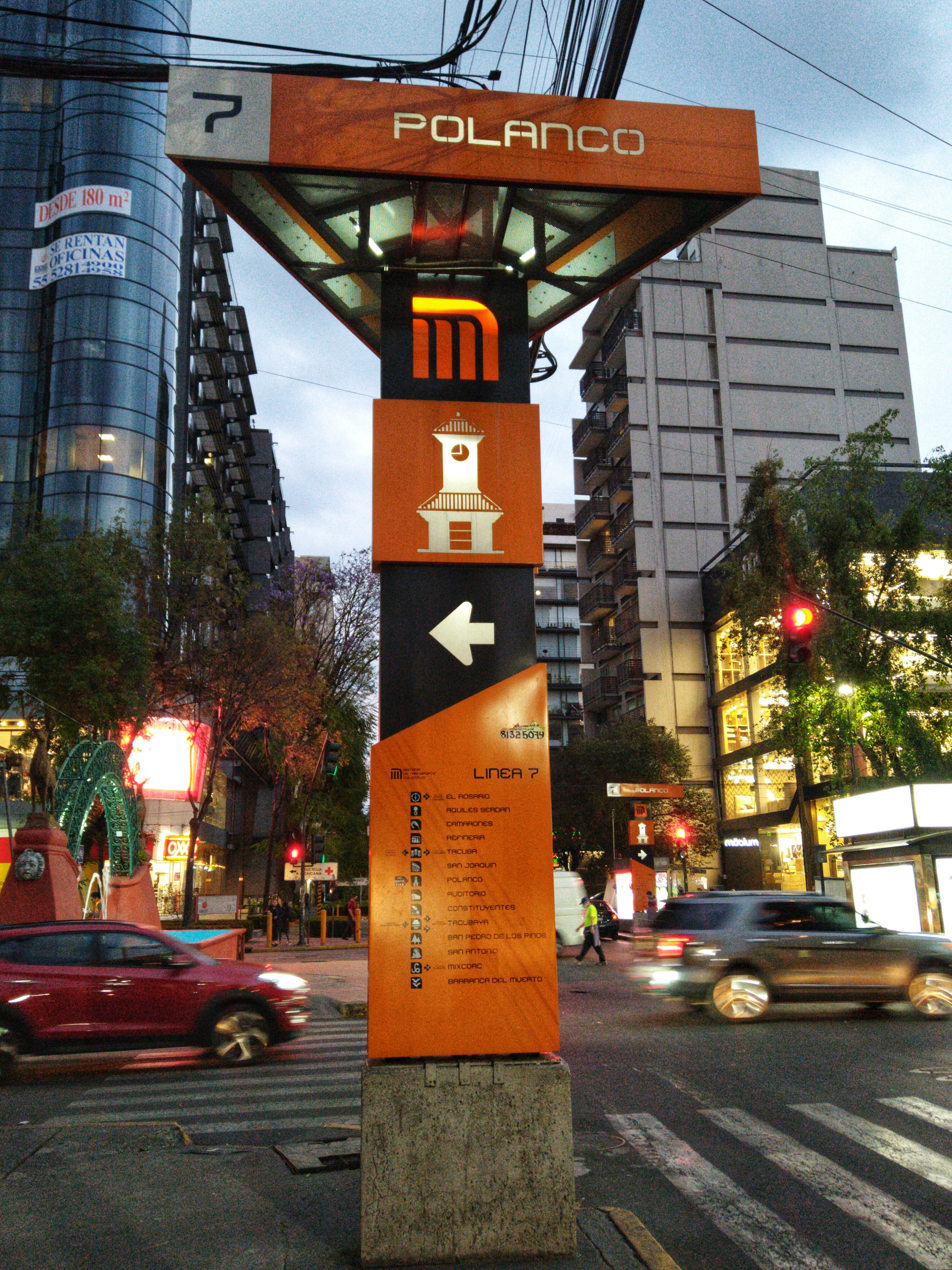
- Station sign, 2022

General information
- Location: Horacio Avenue; Miguel Hidalgo, Mexico City; Mexico
- Coordinates: 19°26′01″N 99°11′28″W
- System: Mexico City Metro
- Owner: Government of Mexico City
- Operator: Sistema de Transporte Colectivo (STC)
- Platforms: 2 side platforms
- Tracks: 2
- Connections: Ecobici; Route: 13-D

Construction
- Structure type: Underground
- Accessible: Partial

Other information
- Status: In service

History
- Opened: 20 December 1984; 41 years ago

Passengers
- 2025: 12,214,282 (Note: The system's website counts only passenger entries into stations and does not include passengers passing through, transferring between lines, or exiting the station. The data here is limited to the most recent ten years to avoid excessive listings; earlier figures can be found in this page's history or on the Mexico City Metro website. To calculate the average daily ridership, the annual total is divided by 365 days (366 in leap years), with decimals omitted from the result. Each station per line is ranked individually, as the system counts transfer stations separately. The percentage change is calculated automatically using the data from the current year and the previous year.) ▲3.48%
- Rank: 17/195

Services
Preceding station	Mexico City Metro	Following station
San Joaquín toward El Rosario	Line 7	Auditorio toward Barranca del Muerto
Route map
Location
- Location within Mexico City
- Area map and exits

Polanco metro station (Note: Estación del Metro Polanco. Spanish pronunciation: [poˈlaŋko].) is a station of the Mexico City Metro in the city's borough of Miguel Hidalgo. It is an underground stop with two side platforms serving Line 7 (Orange Line), between San Joaquín and Auditorio. It was opened on 20 December 1984, providing service north toward Tacuba and southwest toward Auditorio.

Polanco metro station services the colonia (neighborhood) of Polanco, one of the most expensive shopping districts in the country, and is named after it. The pictogram depicts the clock tower at nearby Lincoln Park. The station is one of the deepest on the network, and the facilities offer partial accessibility for people with disabilities, including elevators. In addition to escalators, commuters can use the staircases, including a giant piano-shaped set equipped with motion sensors that play key sounds whenever the steps are used. In 2025, the station had an average daily ridership of 33,463 passenger entries, making it the 17th busiest station in the network.

== Location and layout ==
Polanco is an underground metro station on Line 7 located along Avenida Horacio, in the Miguel Hidalgo borough of Mexico City. It serves the affluent Colonia of Polanco, one of the most expensive shopping districts in the country, benefiting visitors of American Park, Plaza Uruguay and Avenida Presidente Masaryk. The area is the most expensive to live in near a metro station, with an average price of Mex$94,800 (around US$4,700) per 1 m^{2} (11 sq ft) as of 2019.

The station has two exits: the west exit at the corner of Avenida Horacio and Calle Temístocles, and the east exit at the corner of Calle Arquímedes on the opposite side of Avenida Horacio. It has a partially accessible service for people with disabilities with elevators and escalators. The latter were renovated in 2018 due to their obsolescence.

Polanco metro station is located between San Joaquín and Auditorio stations on the line. The area is serviced by Route 13-D of the city's public bus system and by the Ecobici network.

=== Landmarks ===
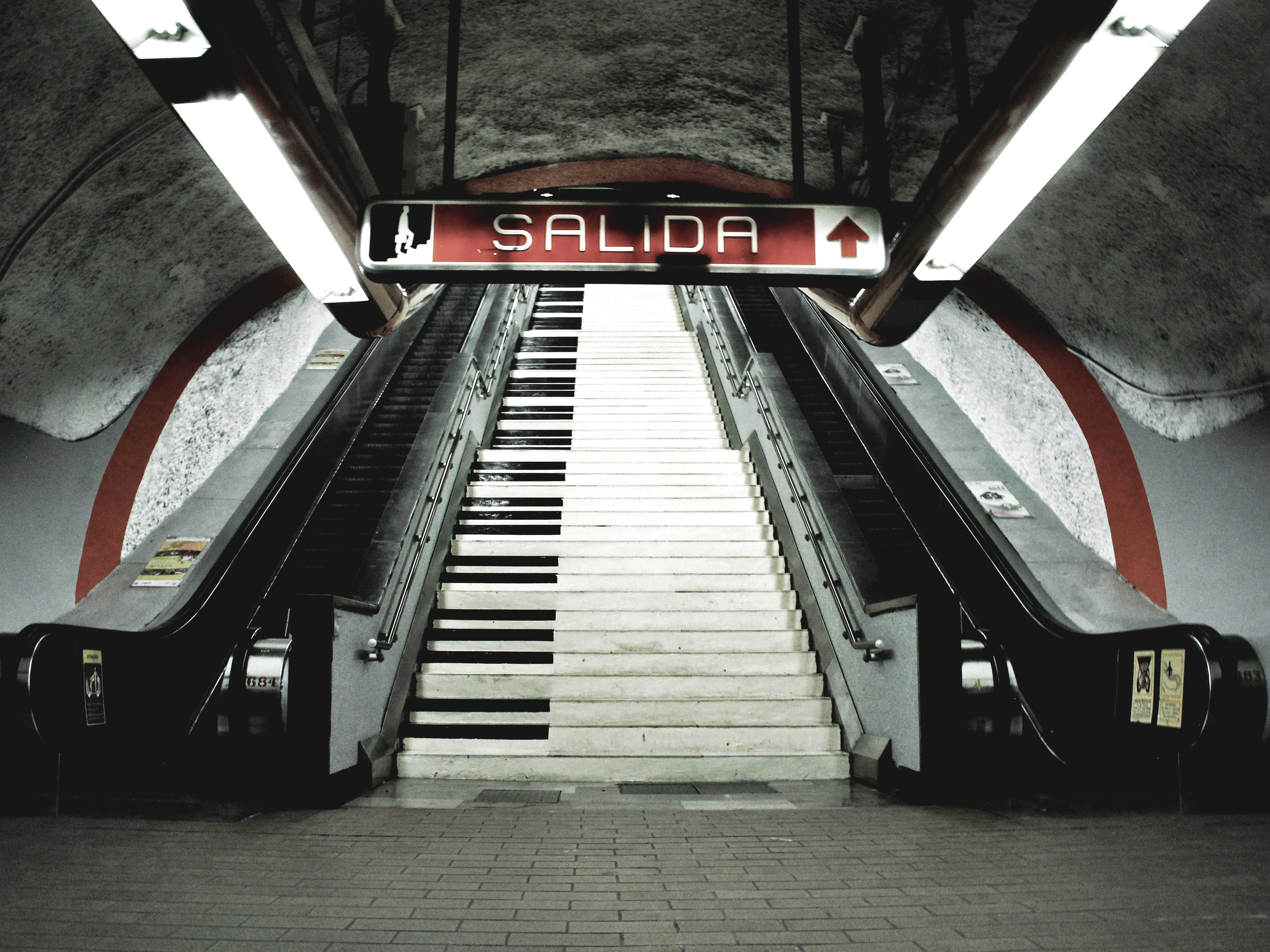
The interactive staircase in 2014

In collaboration with the National Polytechnic Institute, authorities decorated the staircase connecting the platforms with the next level to resemble a piano. It has 54 steps divided into three sections, with two landings. The white steps are made of white marble, and the black ones of black granite. Each white step has a motion sensor that produces a key sound when activated, while black steps have two sensors allowing users to produce accidental notes. The inferior section produces low tones, and the upper part high tones. Laser sensors were installed instead of contact sensors to accommodate high ridership. Their service life is five years but can be extended with proper maintenance. The decoration, installed in 2014, was designed to promote physical stimulation among commuters.

Inside the station's lobby, there are four cultural showcases. In 2017, Polanco was selected as a system's emblematic station in order to promote UNESCO's past and future programs in Mexico.

== History and construction ==
Line 7 of the Mexico City Metro was built by Cometro, a subsidiary of Empresas ICA. Its first section opened on 20 December 1984, operating from Tacuba to Auditorio stations. The tunnel between Polanco and San Joaquín spans 1,163 meters (3,816 ft), while the section toward Auditorio measures 812 meters (2,664 ft). The station is one of the deepest on the network, with staircases totaling around 110 steps.

=== Name and pictogram ===
The station's pictogram features the silhouette of the clock tower found in nearby Lincoln Park. The stop is named after the neighborhood, which takes its name from a river unofficially named after Juan Alfonso de Polanco, a Spanish Jesuit priest.

=== Incidents ===
On 16 October 2019, the escalators suddenly stopped, causing four commuters to fall, including an 82-year-old man. Three were taken to a hospital, but none sustained serious injuries. Investigations revealed that the incident was triggered by a fight between two men on the escalators, who then fled after causing the stoppage.

On 15 January 2023, two cars separated when the train arrived at the station. Witnesses reported an explosion and smoke from the affected area, but no injuries occurred. The accident took place amid government allegations that the transport system faced potential sabotage and other "atypical incidents" supposedly linked to opponents of the Fourth Transformation, the political platform of President Andrés Manuel López Obrador, following the 2023 Mexico City Metro train crash. Guillermo Calderón, director of the Mexico City Metro, explained that a loosened and a disgorged bolt caused a safety cylinder to break, separating the cars. He denied that the incident resulted from maintenance issues, noting that the train had been overhauled just days earlier.

Another stoppage occurred on 24 October 2023, when the escalator abruptly halted and recoiled, injuring seven commuters. Metro authorities reported that damaged fuses in the internal connection suggested it had been manually stopped. Among those injured was Fátima Neri, an international archer and medalist, who suffered a broken leg and was left with a disability due to an alleged misdiagnosis at the hospital where the authorities transported her.

== Ridership ==
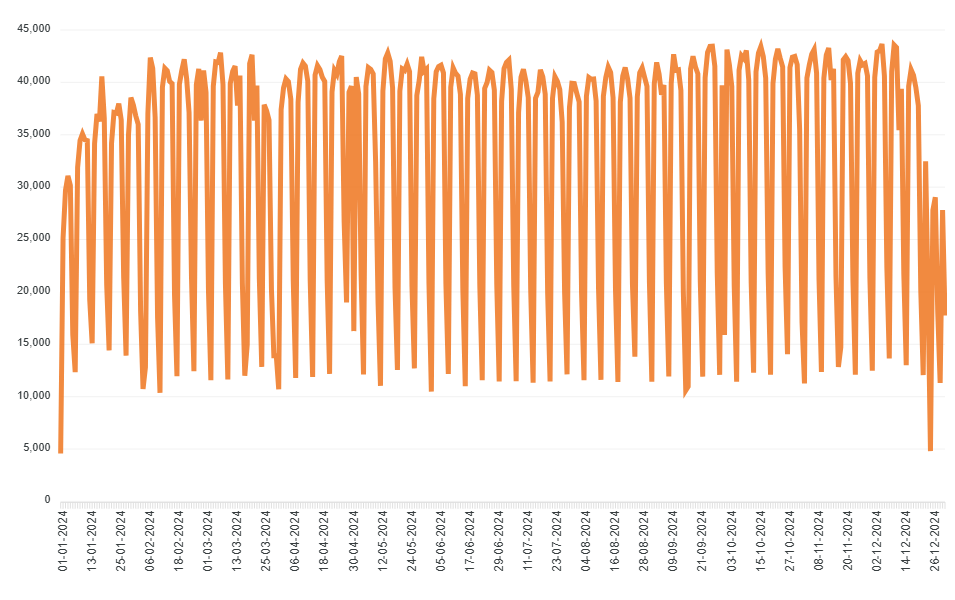
Daily ridership for Polanco station in 2024

According to official data, before the impact of the COVID-19 pandemic, the station recorded between 32,300 and 35,700 average daily entries from 2016 to 2019. In 2025, it recorded 12,214,282 passenger entries, ranking 17th among the system's 195 stations.

Annual passenger ridership
Year	Ridership	Average daily	Rank	% change	Ref.
2025	12,214,282	33,463	17/195	+3.48%	
2024	11,803,141	32,249	15/195	+21.76%	
2023	9,694,024	26,558	26/195	+30.04%	
2022	7,454,437	20,423	40/195	+38.73%	
2021	5,373,504	14,721	45/195	−13.03%	
2020	6,178,428	16,880	40/195	−52.58%	
2019	13,028,555	35,694	24/195	+5.05%	
2018	12,402,252	33,978	29/195	+3.51%	
2017	11,981,607	32,862	32/195	+1.26%	
2016	11,832,706	32,329	38/195	+3.27%	

== Gallery ==
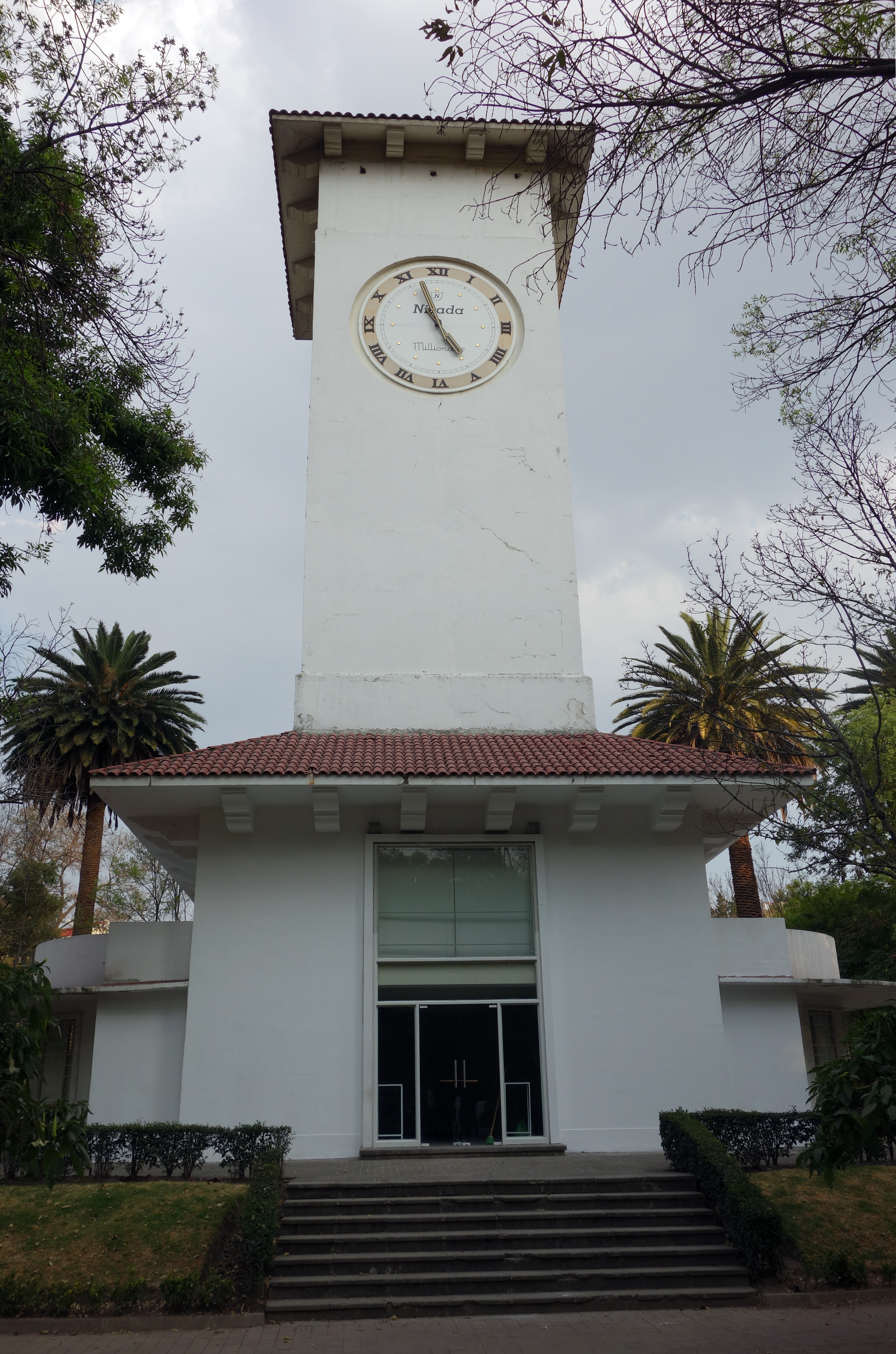
The clock tower at Lincoln Park was the inspiration for the station's pictogram.

== See also ==
- División del Norte metro station, a Mexico City Metro station featuring an interactive piano and karaoke
