= Constituyentes metro station =

Mexico City metro station

Constituyentes
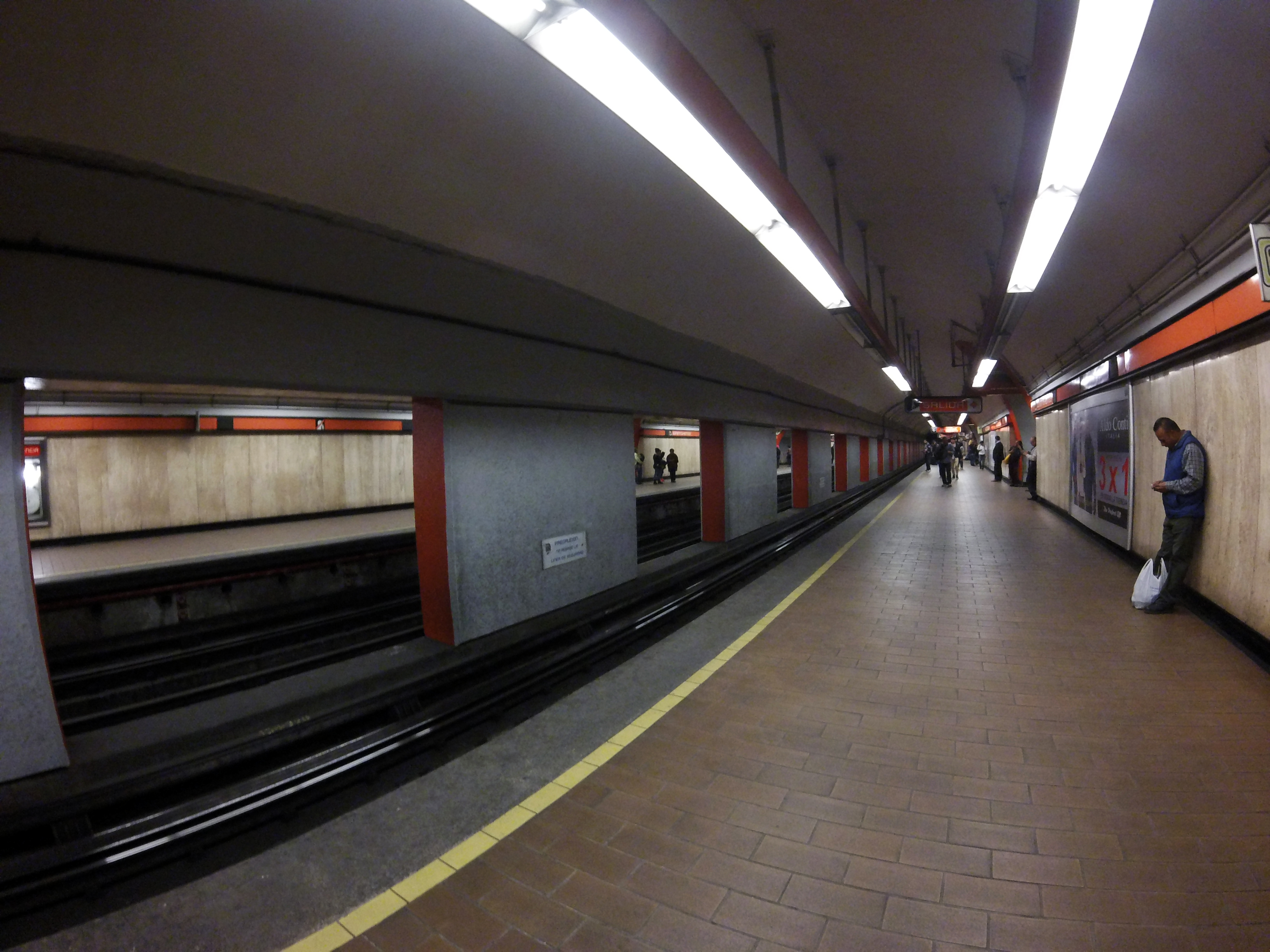
- Station platforms, December 2016

General information
- Location: Av. Parque Lira; Col. Ampliación Daniel Garza, Miguel Hidalgo; Mexico City; Mexico
- Coordinates: 19°24′43″N 99°11′29″W
- System: Mexico City Metro
- Operator: Sistema de Transporte Colectivo (STC)
- Platforms: 2 side platforms
- Tracks: 2
- Connections: Los Pinos / Constituyentes

Construction
- Structure type: Underground
- Depth: 40 m (130 ft)
- Platform levels: 1
- Parking: No
- Cycle facilities: No
- Accessible: Partial

Other information
- Status: In service

History
- Opened: 23 August 1985; 41 years ago

Passengers
- 2025: 4,812,800 (Note: The data here is limited to the most recent ten years to avoid excessive listings; earlier figures can be found in this page's history or on the Mexico City Metro website. To calculate the average daily ridership, the annual total is divided by 365 days (366 in leap years), with decimals omitted from the result. Each station per line is ranked individually, as the system counts transfer stations separately. The percentage change is calculated automatically using the data from the current year and the previous year.) ▲21.79%
- Rank: 109/195

Services
Preceding station	Mexico City Metro	Following station
Auditorio toward El Rosario	Line 7	Tacubaya toward Barranca del Muerto
Route map
Location
- Location within Mexico City
- Area map

Constituyentes is a station on Line 7 of the Mexico City metro on the western outskirts of the city center. It serves Chapultepec Park and numerous attractions therein, as well as the Luis Barragán House and Studio. The station opened on 23 August 1985.

The station is named after the nearby Avenida Constituyentes. The station's icon shows a quill, a pot of ink and a book, in reference to the Mexican constitutions of 1824, 1857 and 1917. Constituyentes serves the San Miguel Chapultepec and Ampliación Daniel Garza neighborhoods, in the Miguel Hidalgo borough.

From 23 April to 17 June 2020, the station was temporarily closed due to the COVID-19 pandemic in Mexico.

== Ridership ==
Annual passenger ridership
Year	Ridership	Average daily	Rank	% change	Ref.
2025	4,812,800	13,185	109/195	+21.79%
2024	3,951,640	10,796	123/195	+53.88%
2023	2,568,034	7,035	140/195	+42.87%
2022	1,797,469	4,924	157/195	+55.86%
2021	1,153,246	3,159	183/195	+0.72%
2020	1,145,056	3,128	183/195	−62.37%
2019	3,042,974	8,336	162/195	−5.72%
2018	3,227,704	8,843	159/195	+5.80%
2017	3,050,791	8,358	159/195	−4.03%
2016	3,178,801	8,685	159/195	+2.82%

== Nearby ==
- Bosque de Chapultepec, city park and zoo.
- Luis Barragán House and Studio, museum exhibiting Luis Barragán's work.
- Los Pinos, official residence and office of the President of Mexico.

== Exits ==
- North: Av. Parque Lira and Av. Constituyentes, Colonia Ampliación Daniel Garza
- South: Av. Parque Lira and Av. Constituyentes, Colonia Ampliación Daniel Garza

== Gallery ==
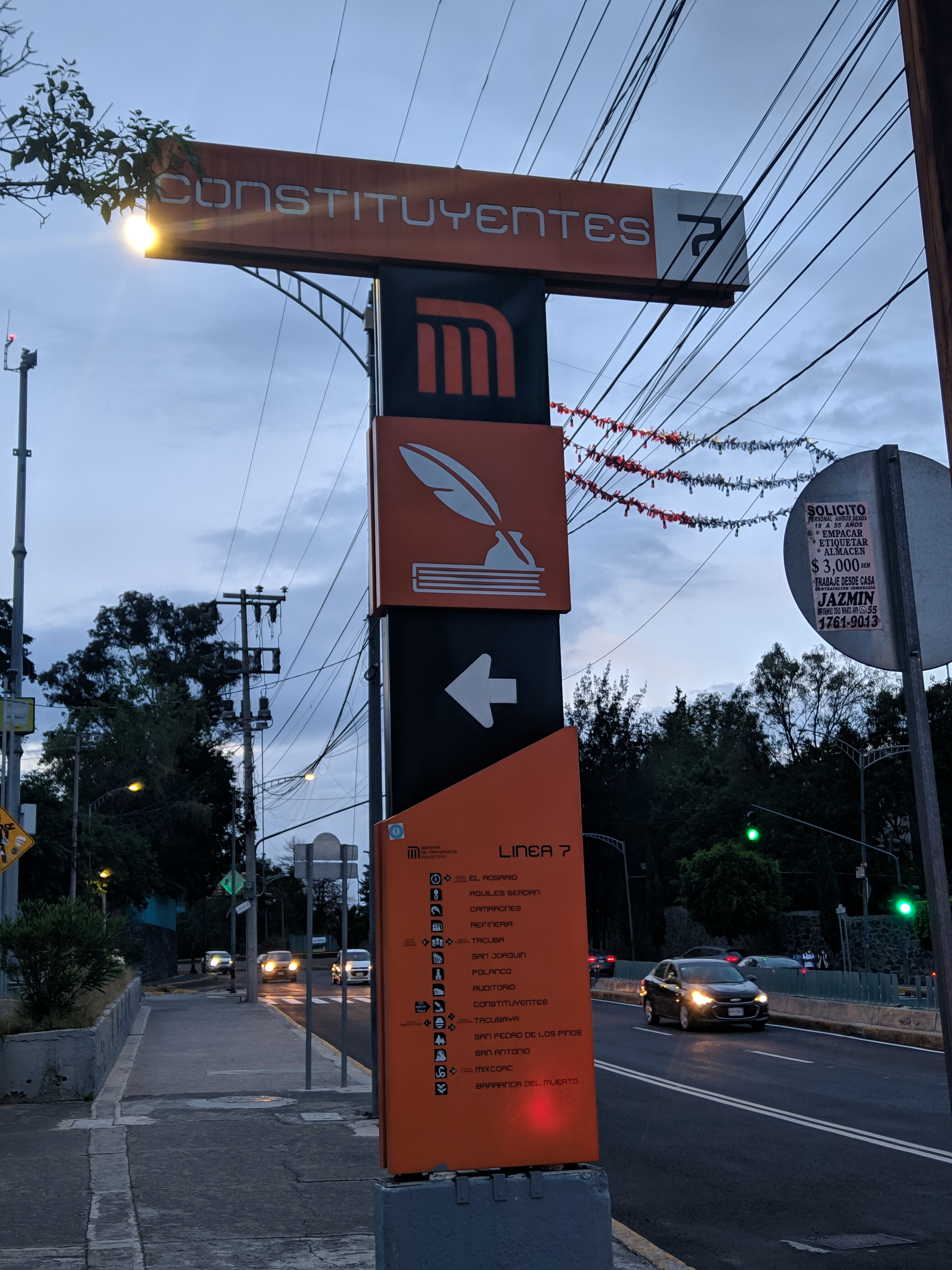
Station entry sign on Av. Parque Lira

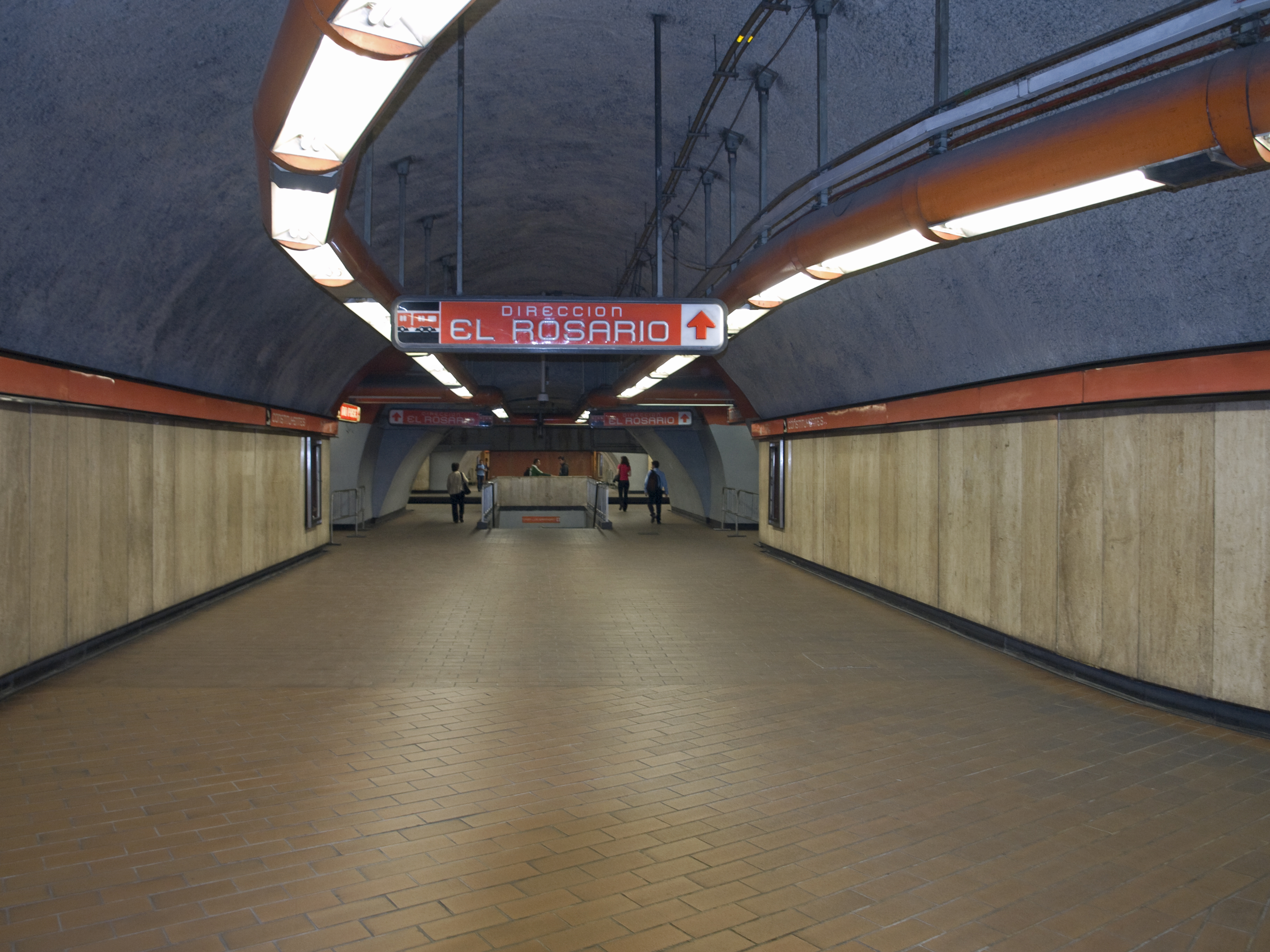
Station passage towards the platforms

== Services and accessibility ==
The station has accessibility for the disabled. It has services such as turnstiles and information screens.
