= Mexico City Metro Line 7 =

Metro line in Mexico City

Line 7

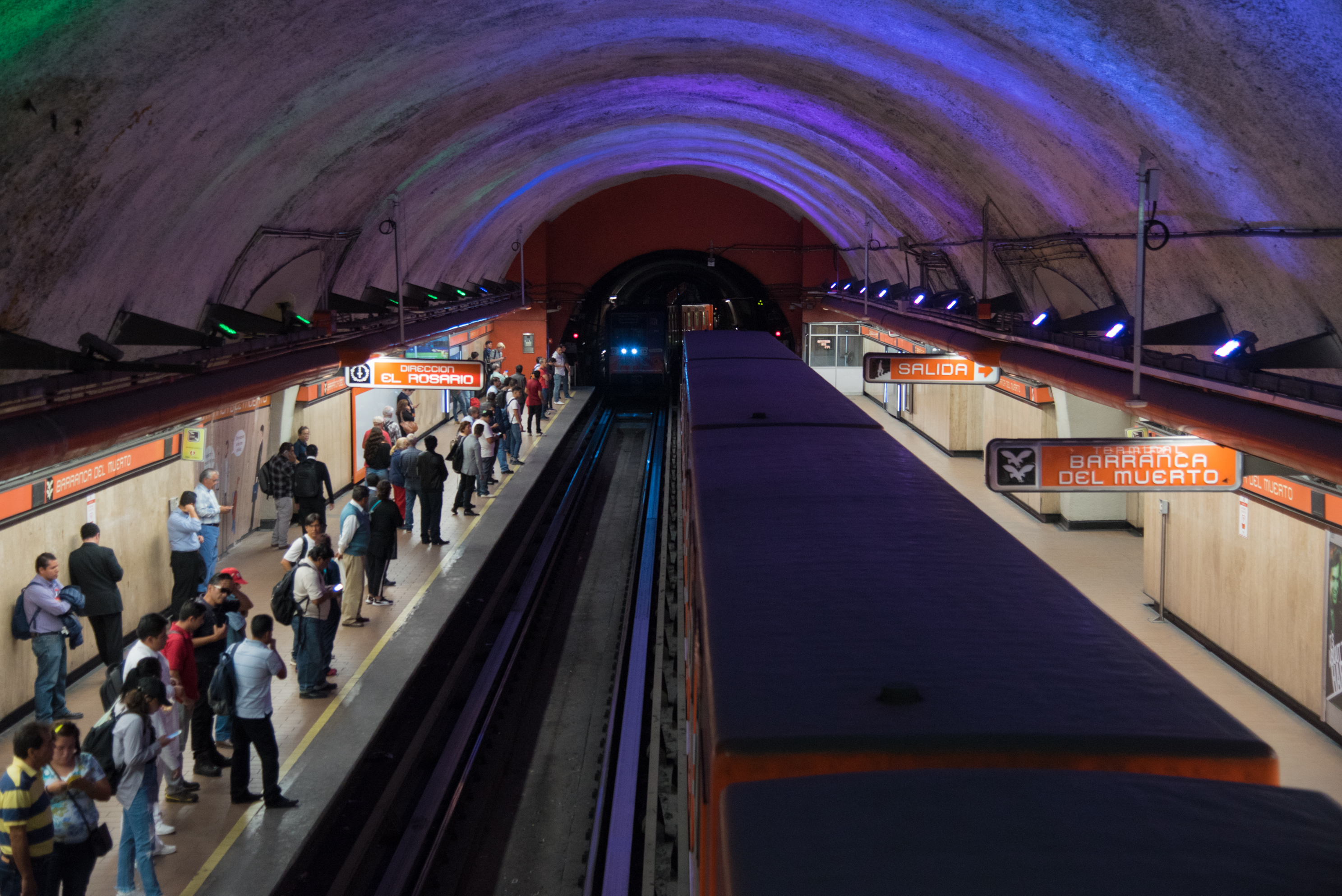
- A train at Barranca del Muerto terminal station

Overview
- Locale: Mexico City
- Termini: El Rosario; Barranca del Muerto
- Connecting lines: at El Rosario; at Tacuba; at Tacubaya; at Mixcoac
- Stations: 14
- Website: metro.cdmx.gob.mx

Service
- Type: Rapid transit
- System: Mexico City Metro
- Operator(s): Sistema de Transporte Colectivo (STC)
- Rolling stock: NM-73BR, NM-79 NM-83A, NM-02
- Ridership: 85,606,835 (2024)

History
- Opened: December 20, 1984; 41 years ago
- Last extension: 1988

Technical
- Line length: 17.011 km (10.6 mi)
- Track length: 18.784 km (11.7 mi)
- Number of tracks: 2
- Track gauge: 1,435 mm (4 ft 8 1/2 in) standard gauge with roll ways along track
- Electrification: Guide bar, 750 V DC
Route map
Line 7 route highlighted in gray

Mexico City Metro Line 7 is one of the twelve metro lines operating in Mexico City, Mexico.

Opened in 1984, it was the seventh line to be built. Its distinctive color is orange. With a length of 18.784 kilometers (11.672 mi) and 14 stations, Line 7 runs through western Mexico City from north to south, serving the mayoralties of Azcapotzalco, Miguel Hidalgo, Benito Juárez and Álvaro Obregón. It has transfers with five other lines. In 2021, 51.9 million passengers were accounted for ridership in the line.

== Chronology ==
The first stretch of Line 7 was opened in 1984. It has been expanded three more times, the last being in 1988.

- December 20, 1984: from Tacuba to Auditorio
- August 22, 1985: from Auditorio to Tacubaya
- December 19, 1985: from Tacubaya to Barranca del Muerto
- November 29, 1988: from Tacuba to El Rosario

== Rolling stock ==
Line 7 has had different types of rolling stock throughout the years.

- Alstom MP-68: 1984–1999
- Concarril NM-73: 1984–present
- Concarril NM-79: 1984–present
- Alstom MP-82: 1985–1994
- Concarril NM-83: 1990–present
- CAF NM-02: 2009–present

Currently, out of the 390 trains in the Mexico City Metro network, 33 are in service in Line 7.

== Station list ==
Key (Note: The following list was adapted from different websites and official maps.: Metro connections obtained from the official Mexico City Metro system map.; Accessibility obtained from the Mexico City Metro system map. In some cases, the map omits the accessibility icon as the station(s) are actually partially accessible. However, the respective websites of each station on the official site indicate the respective accessibility methods. Stations with the symbol ‡ are fully accessible; stations with the symbol † are partially accessible.; Cablebús obtained from their official website.; Centro de transferencia modal (CETRAM;) obtained from the official website of the Órgano Regulador de Transporte.; Ecobici obtained from their official website.; Metrobús obtained from the Mexico City Metrobús system map.; Mexibús obtained from the official Mexico City Metro system map.; Mexicable obtained from the official Mexico City Metro system map.; Public buses network (peseros) obtained from the official website of the Órgano Regulador de Transporte.; Red de Transporte de Pasajeros obtained from their official website.; Trolleybuses obtained from their official website.)
Handicapped/disabled access	Fully accessible station	Cablebús Line {{{3}}}	Cablebús connection	Red de Transporte de Pasajeros	RTP connection
Handicapped/disabled access	Partially accessible station	Mexibús	Mexibús connection	Tren Interurbano	Tren Interurbano connection
Transfer hub	CETRAM transfer station	Mexicable	Mexicable connection	Tren Suburbano	Tren Suburbano connection
Transfer hub	ETRAM transfer station	Mexico City Metro	Mexico City Metro connection	Trolleybus	Trolleybus connection
Ecobici	Ecobici bikeshare	Mexico City minubus	Pesero connection	Xochimilco Light Rail	Xochimilco Light Rail connection

The stations from north to south are:

Station	Handicapped/disabled access	Opened	Level	Distance (km)		Connections	Location
Station	Handicapped/disabled access	Opened	Level	Between stations	Total	Connections	Location
El Rosario	Handicapped/disabled access	November 29, 1988	Grade level	-	0.0	Line V (in planning); 19, 19A, 59, 59A, 107	Azcapotzalco
Aquiles Serdán	Handicapped/disabled access	November 29, 1988	Underground	1.8	1.8	59, 59A, 107	Azcapotzalco
Camarones	Handicapped/disabled access	November 29, 1988	Underground	1.5	3.3	12, 59, 59A, 107; 10B, 10E	Azcapotzalco
Refinería	Handicapped/disabled access	November 29, 1988	Underground	1.1	4.4	59, 107, 107B; 16D	Azcapotzalco
Tacuba	Handicapped/disabled access	December 20, 1984	Underground	1.4	5.8	18, 59, 107; 11A, 16B, 16D, 19H	Miguel Hidalgo
San Joaquín	Handicapped/disabled access	December 20, 1984	Underground	1.6	7.4		Miguel Hidalgo
Polanco	Handicapped/disabled access	December 20, 1984	Underground	1.3	8.7	13D	Miguel Hidalgo
Auditorio	Handicapped/disabled access	December 20, 1984	Underground	1.0	9.7	(at Auditorio); 76, 76A, 300A; 8B, 8C, 8D, 18D	Miguel Hidalgo
Constituyentes	Handicapped/disabled access	August 22, 1985	Underground	1.6	11.3	(under construction); 34A; 8C	Miguel Hidalgo
Tacubaya	Handicapped/disabled access	August 22, 1985	Underground	1.2	12.5	110, 110B, 110C, 112, 113B, 115, 118, 119, 200; 1B, 9C, 9E, 21A	Miguel Hidalgo
San Pedro de los Pinos	Handicapped/disabled access	December 19, 1985	Underground	1.2	13.7	13A, 112, 115A, 119, 200; 21A	Benito Juárez
San Antonio	Handicapped/disabled access	December 19, 1985	Underground	0.8	14.5	13A, 112, 115A, 119, 200; 21A	Benito Juárez
Mixcoac	Handicapped/disabled access	December 19, 1985	Underground	0.9	15.4	1D, 13A, 115A, 116, 119B, 124, 124A, 200; 21A	Benito Juárez
Barranca del Muerto	Handicapped/disabled access	December 19, 1985	Underground	1.6	17.0	13A, 115A, 116, 121A, 124, 124A; 6A, 21A, 21D	Álvaro Obregón

== Ridership ==
The following table shows each of Line 7 stations total and average daily ridership during 2019.

†	Transfer station
‡	Terminal
†‡	Transfer station and terminal

Rank	Station	Total ridership	Average daily
1	Barranca del Muerto‡	16,681,529	45,703
2	El Rosario†‡	12,792,425	35,048
3	Polanco	13,028,555	35,695
4	Auditorio	12,503,639	34,257
5	San Joaquín	10,755,360	29,467
6	Mixcoac†	8,073,781	22,120
7	Aquiles Serdán	5,785,502	15,851
8	Camarones	5,697,048	15,608
9	San Antonio	5,293,530	14,503
10	San Pedro de los Pinos	4,993,274	13,680
11	Refinería	3,980,593	10,906
12	Tacuba†	3,173,516	8,695
13	Constituyentes	3,042,974	8,337
14	Tacubaya†	2,350,325	6,439
Total		108,152,051	296,307

== Tourism ==
Line 7 passes near several places of interest:

- Polanco, upscale district in Mexico City.
- Bosque de Chapultepec, city park.
  - Chapultepec Zoo
- Auditorio Nacional, entertainment venue.
- Paseo de la Reforma, emblematic avenue of Mexico City.
- Mixcoac, neighborhood designated barrio mágico (magical neighborhood).

== See also ==
- List of Mexico City Metro lines
