= San Pedro de los Pinos =

- Neighborhood of Mexico City
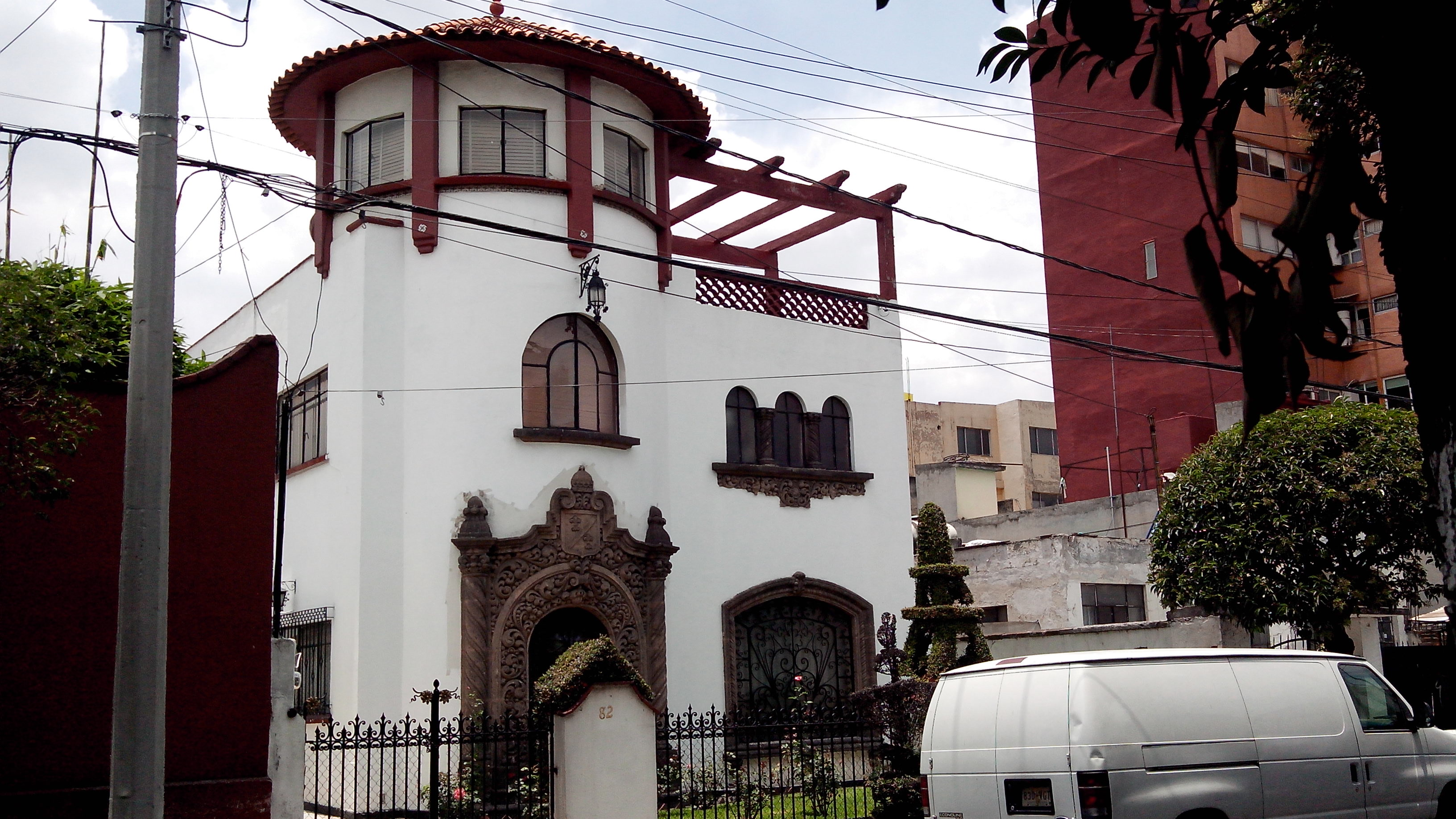
- Californian style house in San Pedro de los Pinos

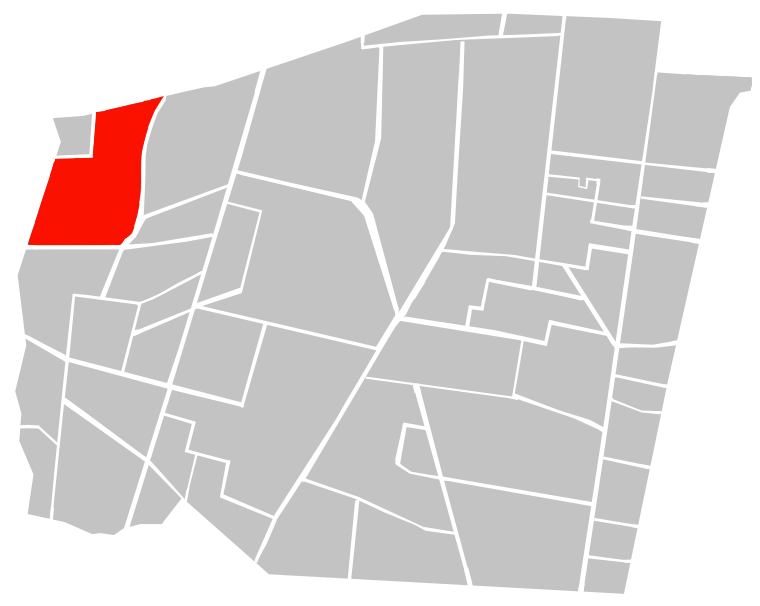
- Location of San Pedro de los Pinos (in red) within Benito Juárez borough
- Country: Mexico
- City: Mexico City
- Municipality: Benito Juárez

Area
  - Total: 0.94 km^{2} (0.36 sq mi)

Population (2022)
  - Total: 12,007
- Postal code: 03800

San Pedro de los Pinos is a neighborhood located in center-west of Mexico City. Before being urbanized during the first half of the 20th century, the colonia was part of a vast farming area belonging to several ranches and haciendas.

== Location ==
San Pedro de los Pinos is located in the Benito Juárez borough of Mexico City.

The neighborhood is bordered by:

- 11 de abril street on the north, across which is Tacubaya, in the Miguel Hidalgo borough
- Calle 2 street on the northwest, across which is Colonia 8 de agosto
- Anillo Periférico on the west, across which is the Álvaro Obregón borough
- Río Becerra on the south and east, across which is Santa María Nonoalco on the south, and Colonia Nápoles and Colonia Ampliación Nápoles on the east

== Description ==
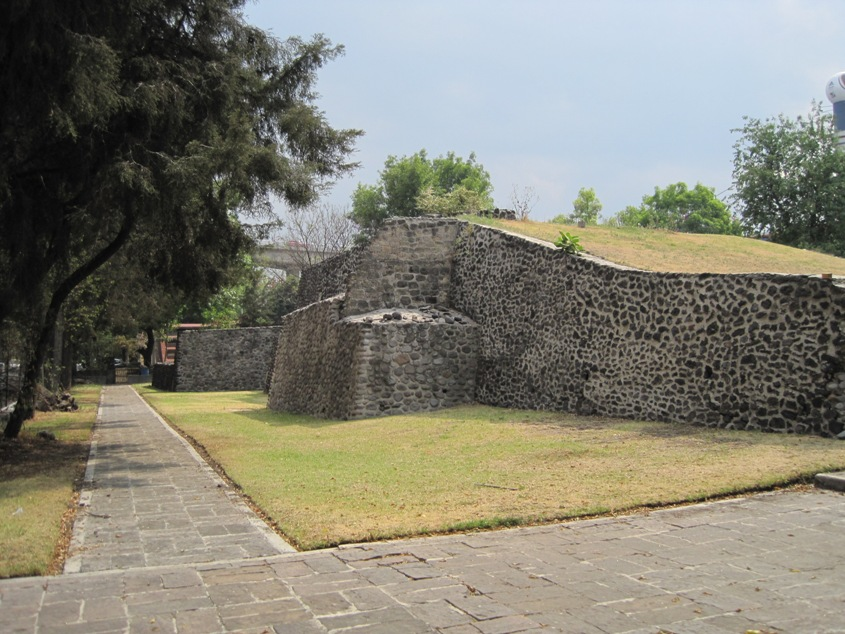
Mixcoac archaeological zone

San Pedro de los Pinos is a mixed neighborhood with both residential and commercial buildings. Most of the residential buildings date back to the first half of the 20th century, though new apartment buildings are being built in the zone.

The neighborhood has a wide variety of entertainment and commercial buildings, including hotels, restaurants, banks, cafés and gymnasiums.

The colonia has two public parks: Parque Pombo and Parque Miraflores.

In the southern part of San Pedro de los Pinos there is an archaeological site dating to the Mesoamerican postclassic period, known simply as Mixcoac archaeological zone. In this same area, there is a cultural center named "La Pirámide" (the pyramid), where several artistic and sports activities take place.

Metropoli Patriotismo is a large shopping center and mixed-use complex in the neighborhood of 120,000 square metres (1,300,000 sq ft).

Avenida Revolución and Patriotismo are landmarks, wide, one-way boulevards through San Pedro de los Pinos that form part of the Circuito Interior, most of which is a controlled-access freeway, but in this section consists of the two surface streets.

== History ==
The area was already populated since pre-Columbian era as shown by the Mixcoac archaeological site.

During 17th and 18th century, several ranches and haciendas were established here, as well as a bartizan, the bartizan of San Pedro, which was in the middle of the route going from the center of Mexico City towards Mixcoac or San Ángel in the south. The soil here was very fertile, thus, having plenty of groves, mainly pines. Hence the name San Pedro de los Pinos.

== Transportation ==
=== Public transportation ===
The area is served by the Mexico City Metro and EcoBici bikeshare. Although not in the neighborhood proper, San Antonio metro station is within walking distance.

Metro stations

- San Pedro de los Pinos.
