= Mixcoac metro station =

Mexico City metro station

Mixcoac
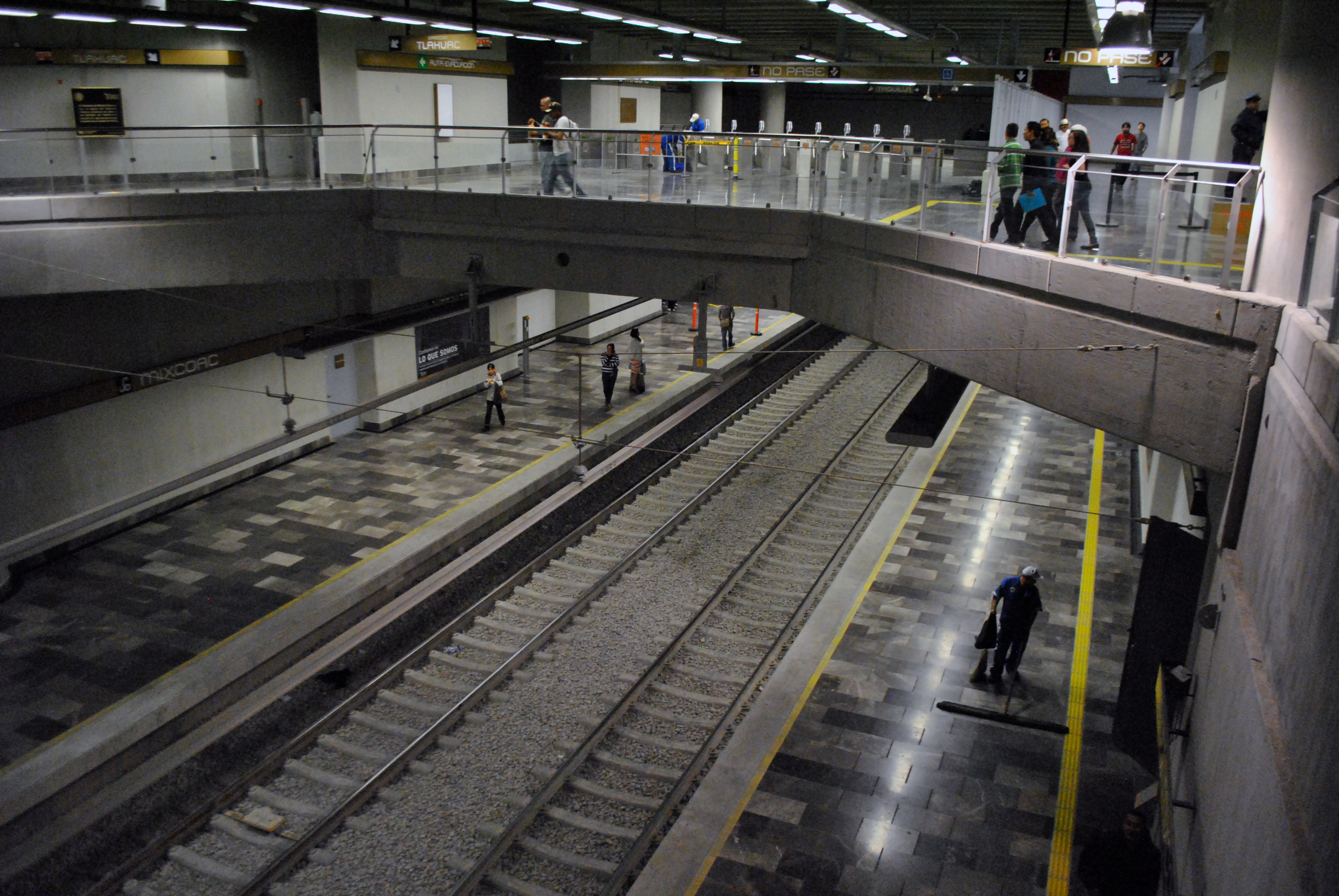
- The platforms for Line 12 just after opening in 2012.

General information
- Location: Av. Revolución and Av. Extremadura; Benito Juárez, Mexico City; Mexico
- Coordinates: 19.375891°N 99.187531°W
- System: Mexico City Metro
- Operator: Sistema de Transporte Colectivo (STC)
- Platforms: 4 side platforms
- Tracks: 4

Construction
- Structure type: Underground
- Depth: 35 m (115 ft)
- Platform levels: 2
- Parking: no
- Cycle facilities: yes
- Accessible: yes

Other information
- Status: In service

History
- Opened: 19 December 1985; 40 years ago 30 October 2012; 13 years ago

Key dates
- 3 May 2021; 5 years ago: Temporarily closed
- 15 January 2023; 3 years ago: Reopened

Passengers
- 2025: Total: 11,163,214; 5,962,258 (Note: The data here is limited to the most recent ten years to avoid excessive listings; earlier figures can be found in this page's history or on the Mexico City Metro website. To calculate the average daily ridership, the annual total is divided by 365 days (366 in leap years), with decimals omitted from the result. Each station per line is ranked individually, as the system counts transfer stations separately. The percentage change is calculated automatically using the data from the current year and the previous year.); 5,200,956 ▲11.94%
- Rank: 78/195; 99/195

Services
Preceding station	Mexico City Metro	Following station
San Antonio toward El Rosario	Line 7	Barranca del Muerto Terminus
Terminus	Line 12	Insurgentes Sur toward Tláhuac
Valentín Campa expected 2028–2030 toward Observatorio	Line 12	Insurgentes Sur toward Tláhuac
Route map
Location
- Location within Mexico City
- Area map

Mixcoac is a station on Line 7 and Line 12 of the Mexico City Metro. The station serves both lines as a transfer station and as the northwestern terminus of Line 12. In 2019, the station had an average total ridership of 54,963 passengers per day.

== History ==
The station opened on 19 December 1985 as part of the third stage of Line 7.

In 2012, with the inauguration of Line 12, Mixcoac became a transfer station, as well as the temporary terminus of the mentioned line.

An extension of Line 12 from Mixcoac to Observatorio is under construction, projected to be finished by 2020. By that time, Mixcoac will no longer work as the western terminus of Line 12.

== General information ==
The station runs deep under Avenida Revolución, a main thoroughfare in Mexico City. It serves the Mixcoac area of the city. There are two main entrances to the station: one in the west sidewalk of the aforementioned avenue and the other in a small plaza between Avenida Revolución, Avenida Patriotismo, Eje 7 Sur Extremadura and Calle Empresa.

Metro Mixcoac serves the following neighborhoods: Santa María Nonoalco, Mixcoac, San Juan and Insurgentes Mixcoac.

=== Name and pictogram ===
The station is named after the neighborhood of Mixcoac, where it is located. The station pictogram depicts a snake because the Nahuatl name Mixcoac means "Nest of Cloud Serpents".

== Ridership ==
Annual passenger ridership (Line 7)
Year	Ridership	Average daily	Rank	% change	Ref.
2025	5,962,258	16,334	78/195	+0.41%
2024	5,937,843	16,223	77/195	−11.22%
2023	6,688,293	18,324	66/195	−14.77%
2022	7,847,048	16,322	36/195	+31.71%
2021	5,957,730	16,322	35/195	+22.39%
2020	4,867,903	13,300	61/195	−39.71%
2019	8,073,781	22,119	74/195	−4.67%
2018	8,469,708	23,204	67/195	+1.87%
2017	8,314,411	22,779	66/195	−0.50%
2016	8,356,587	22,832	77/195	+1.17%

Annual passenger ridership (Line 12)
Year	Ridership	Average daily	Rank	% change	Ref.
2025	5,200,956	14,249	99/195	+12.11%
2024	4,639,093	12,675	106/195	+41.26%
2023	3,284,195	8,997	126/195	NA
2022	0	0	176/195	−100.00%
2021	693,814	1,900	186/195	−76.21%
2020	2,916,713	7,969	120/195	−51.03%
2019	5,956,326	16,318	111/195	+3.15%
2018	5,774,280	7,844	113/195	+4.83%
2017	5,508,039	15,090	116/195	+11.81%
2016	4,926,393	13,460	126/195	+15.10%

== Metro Museum ==
Mixcoac station houses the Museo del Metro (Metro Museum), a museum dedicated to the history and culture of the Mexico City Metro.

The museum has seven rooms, each one with specific items including: whiteprints, floor plans and technical drawings from the construction of the metro, a collection of photos, metro tickets from different periods and archeological objects that have been found during the excavations to build the twelve metro lines.

== Exits ==
=== Line 7 ===
- East: Av. Revolución between Extremadura street and Empresa street, Mixcoac
- West: Av. Revolución between Andrea del Sarto street and Benvenuto Cellini street, Col. Santa María Nonoalco

=== Line 12 ===
- Southeast: Av. Patriotismo and Donatelo street, Insurgentes Mixcoac
- Northeast: Empresa street and Av. Revolución, Col. San Juan

== Gallery ==
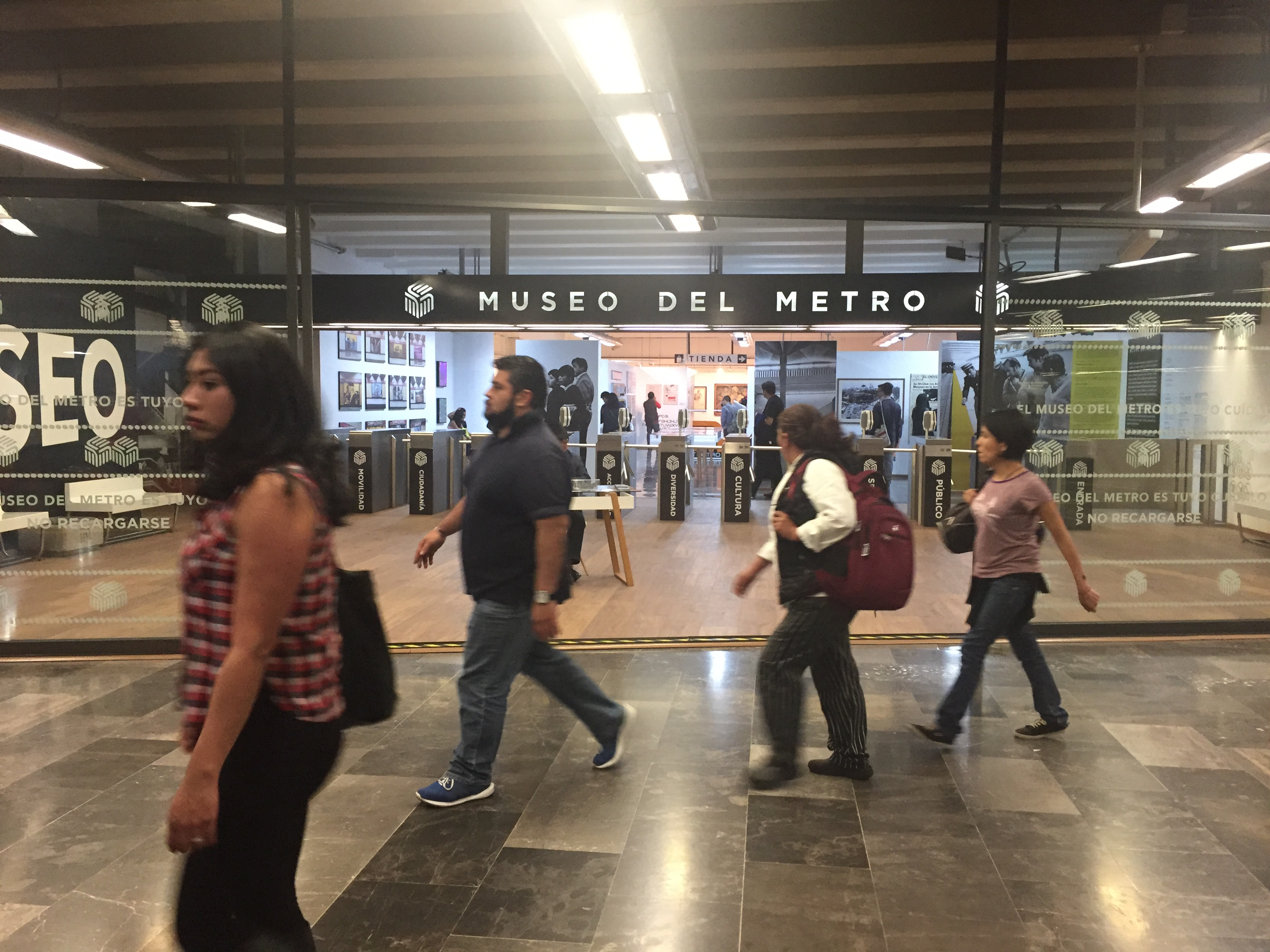
Entrance to the Museo del Metro

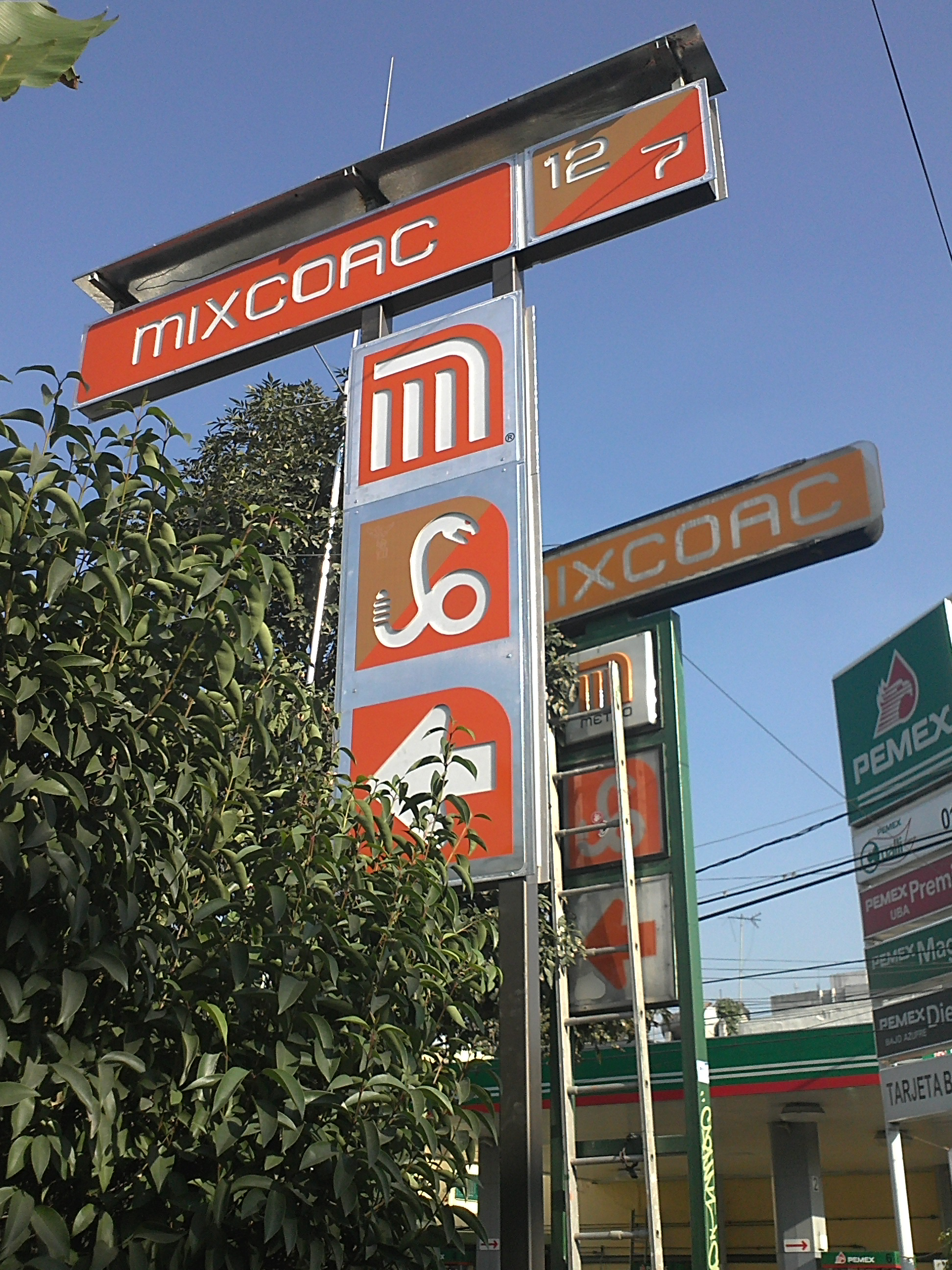
Entry sign for Mixcoac station (newer and former versions)
