= Barranca del Muerto metro station =

Mexico City metro station

Barranca del Muerto
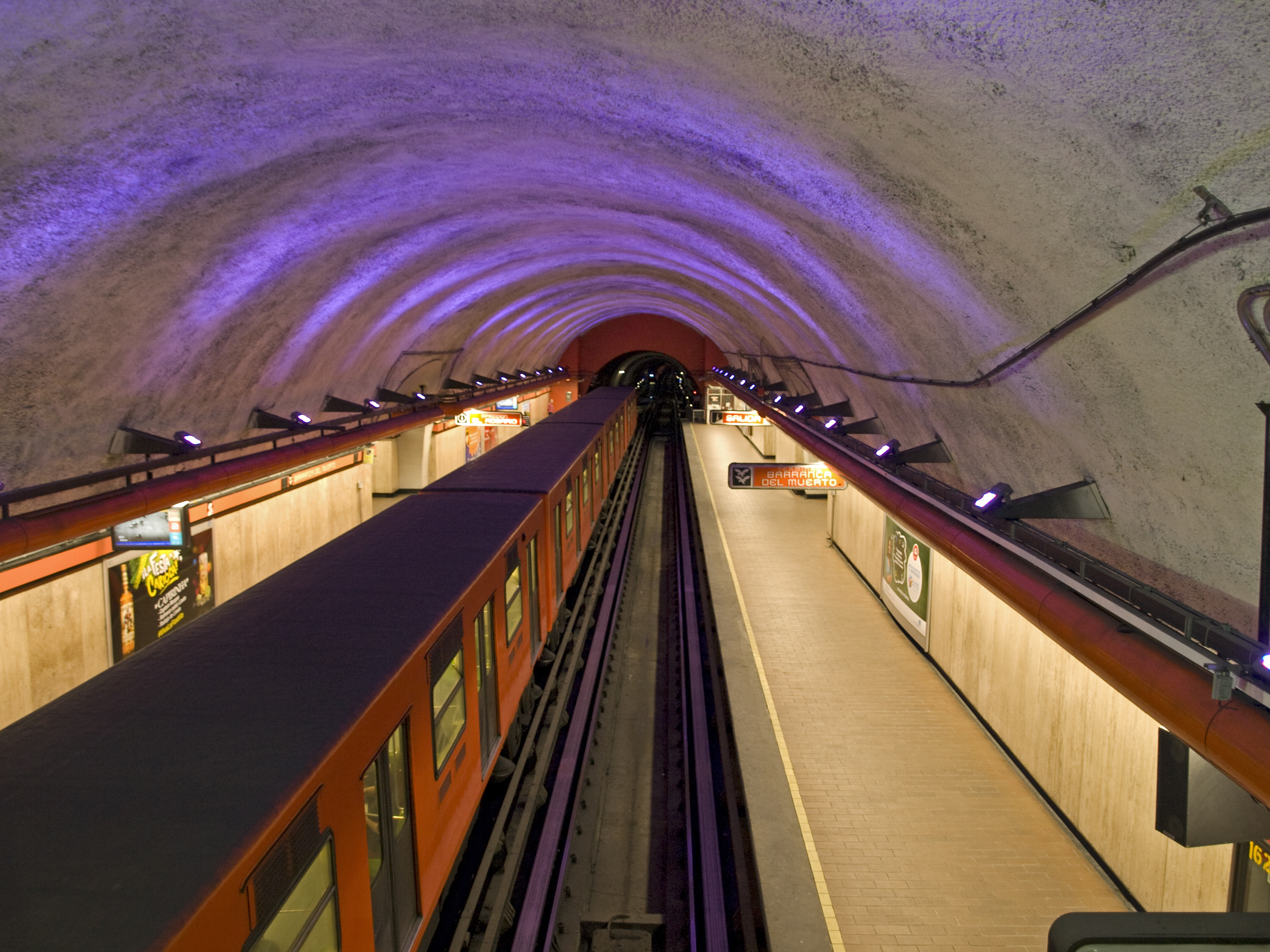
- Station platforms

General information
- Location: Avenida Revolución; Los Alpes, Álvaro Obregón; Mexico City; Mexico
- Coordinates: 19°21′38″N 99°11′25″W
- System: Mexico City Metro
- Operator: Sistema de Transporte Colectivo (STC)
- Platforms: 2 side platforms
- Tracks: 2

Construction
- Structure type: Underground
- Platform levels: 1
- Parking: No
- Cycle facilities: No
- Accessible: Partial

Other information
- Status: In service

History
- Opened: 19 December 1985; 40 years ago

Passengers
- 2025: 11,434,645 (Note: The data here is limited to the most recent ten years to avoid excessive listings; earlier figures can be found in this page's history or on the Mexico City Metro website. To calculate the average daily ridership, the annual total is divided by 365 days (366 in leap years), with decimals omitted from the result. Each station per line is ranked individually, as the system counts transfer stations separately. The percentage change is calculated automatically using the data from the current year and the previous year.) ▲2.98%
- Rank: 18/195

Services
Preceding station	Mexico City Metro	Following station
Mixcoac toward El Rosario	Line 7	Terminus
Route map
Location
- Location within Mexico City
- Area map

Barranca del Muerto is the southern terminus of Line 7 of the Mexico City Metro. It is located in the Álvaro Obregón borough. In 2019, the station had an average ridership of 45,703 passengers per day, making it the busiest station in Line 7.

== Name and pictogram ==
The metro station is named after Avenida Barranca del Muerto, which was once a big depression, and is the same length as the actual avenue (barranca means gully or ravine). During the Mexican Revolution (1910–1921) this was a place where revolutionary soldiers dropped many corpses. Eagles and buzzards flew nearby, smelling rotten flesh. Popular imagination refers to the dead people's souls and ghosts restlessly promenading near that big hole. Thus, Barranca del Muerto means "Canyon of the Dead".

The station's pictogram depicts two eagles, although some say buzzards.

== History ==
Metro Barranca del Muerto was opened on 19 December 1985, together with the whole 5 kilometres (3.1 mi) long extension stretch of Line 7 from Tacubaya.

This station was supposed to be a provisional terminal. According to original plans, Line 7 would be extended south and reach as far as San Jerónimo. Nevertheless, such plans never materialized, and Barranca del Muerto has been Line 7 southern terminus since.

Recently, in 2017, mayors from the Álvaro Obregón and Magdalena Contreras municipalities, have asked Mexico City's government to pick up the project again and continue with the southern expansion of the line to San Jerónimo, that would benefit around 500,000 inhabitants of both municipalities.

== General information ==
Metro Barranca del Muerto is located at the intersection of Avenida Revolución and Avenida Barranca del Muerto, on the border of the Álvaro Obregón and Benito Juárez municipalities.

The station has two separate platforms, one used for arriving trains and another one for departing trains. The exit is at the middle of the platforms. There are two exits located at the intersection of Avenida Revolución (which leads further to San Ángel), Macedonio Alcala, and Calle Alfonso Caso.

South of Barranca del Muerto, there is a Saturday market at the famous San Jacinto square (Bazar de los sábados de San Jacinto) where artists sell paintings, plants and other handcrafts.

Metro Barranca del Muerto, like many stations in the Metro network, has a cyber center, where users can access the internet through a computer; the service is free. The station also has a cultural display and the sculptural mural Visión del Mictlán by Luis Y. Aragón, which is located right outside the east access to the station.

The station serves the Guadalupe Inn and Los Alpes neighborhoods.

=== Ridership ===
Annual passenger ridership
Year	Ridership	Average daily	Rank	% change	Ref.
2025	11,434,645	31,327	18/195	+2.98%
2024	11,103,749	30,338	19/195	+4.59%
2023	10,616,212	29,085	20/195	+21.47%
2022	8,739,839	23,944	27/195	+19.21%
2021	7,331,623	20,086	23/195	−11.01%
2020	8,238,512	22,509	21/195	−50.61%
2019	16,681,529	45,702	19/195	+3.71%
2018	16,085,373	44,069	19/195	+6.68%
2017	15,078,243	41,310	21/195	+3.93%
2016	14,508,378	39,640	21/195	+5.94%

== Exits ==
- West: Av. Revolución and Condor, Col. Los Alpes
- East: Av. Revolución and Gustavo Campa, Col. Guadalupe Inn

== Station layout ==
G	Street Level	Exit/Entrance
B1	Mezzanine	Ticket windows/Fare control
B2	Side platform, doors will open on the left
B2	Northbound	toward El Rosario (Mixcoac) →
B2	Southbound	← termination track
B2	Side platform, doors will open on the right

== Gallery ==
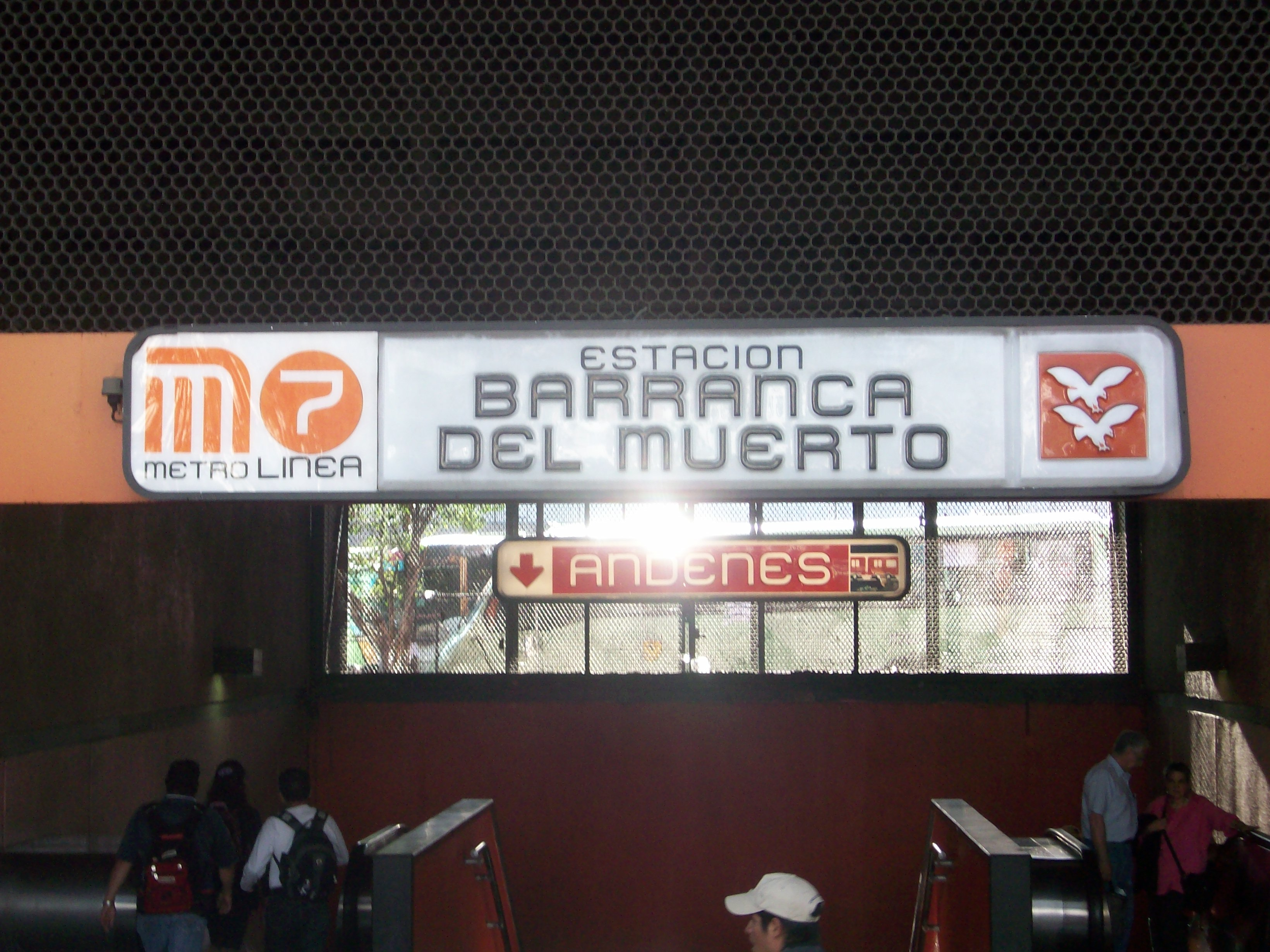
Entrance to the station

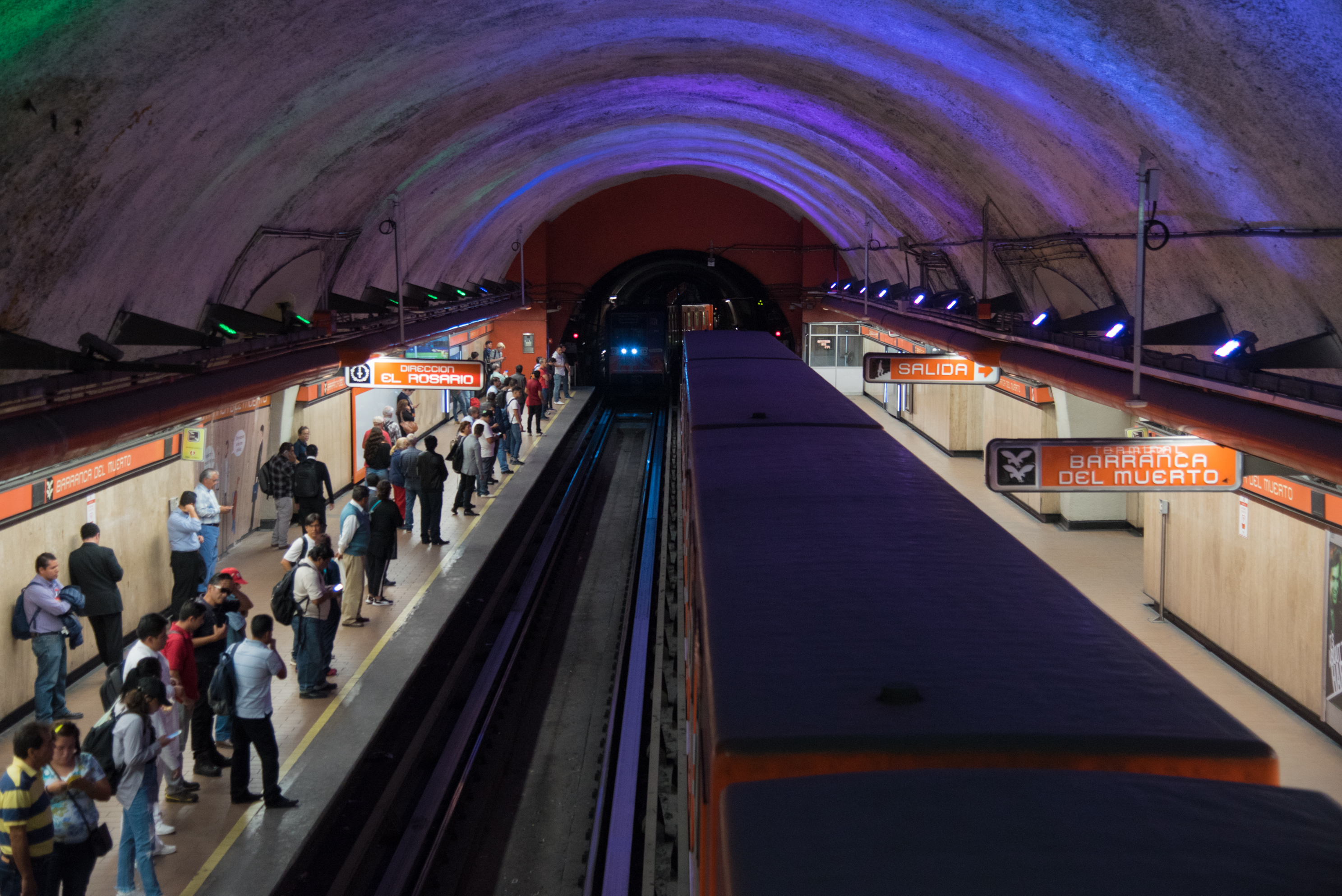
Platforms
