= Insurgentes Mixcoac =

Coordinates: 19.3724°N 99.1832°W

- Neighborhood of Mexico City
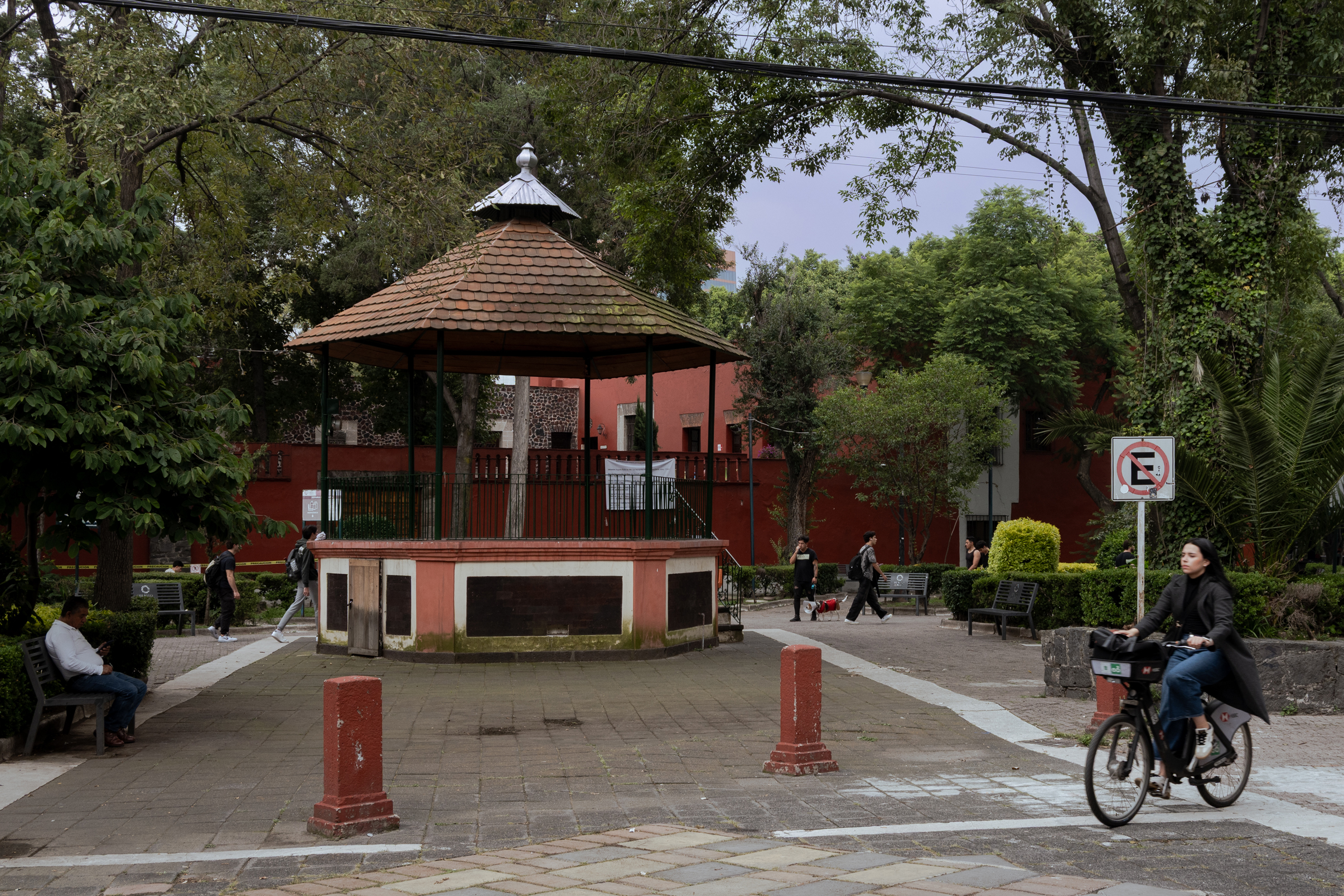
- Plaza Agustín Jáuregui, the heart of historic Mixcoac

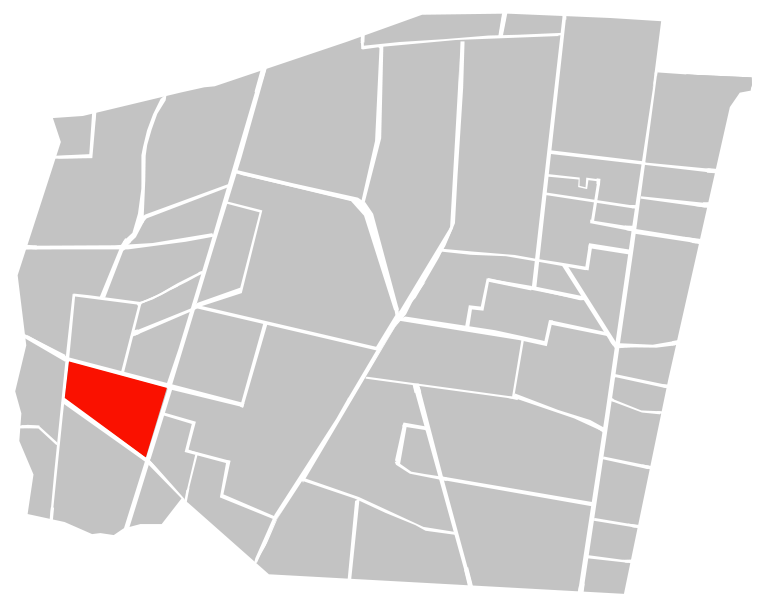
- Location of Insurgentes Mixcoac (in red) within Benito Juárez borough
- Country: Mexico
- City: Mexico City
- Municipality: Benito Juárez

Area
  - Total: 0.51 km^{2} (0.20 sq mi)

Population (2022)
  - Total: 5,184
- Postal code: 03920

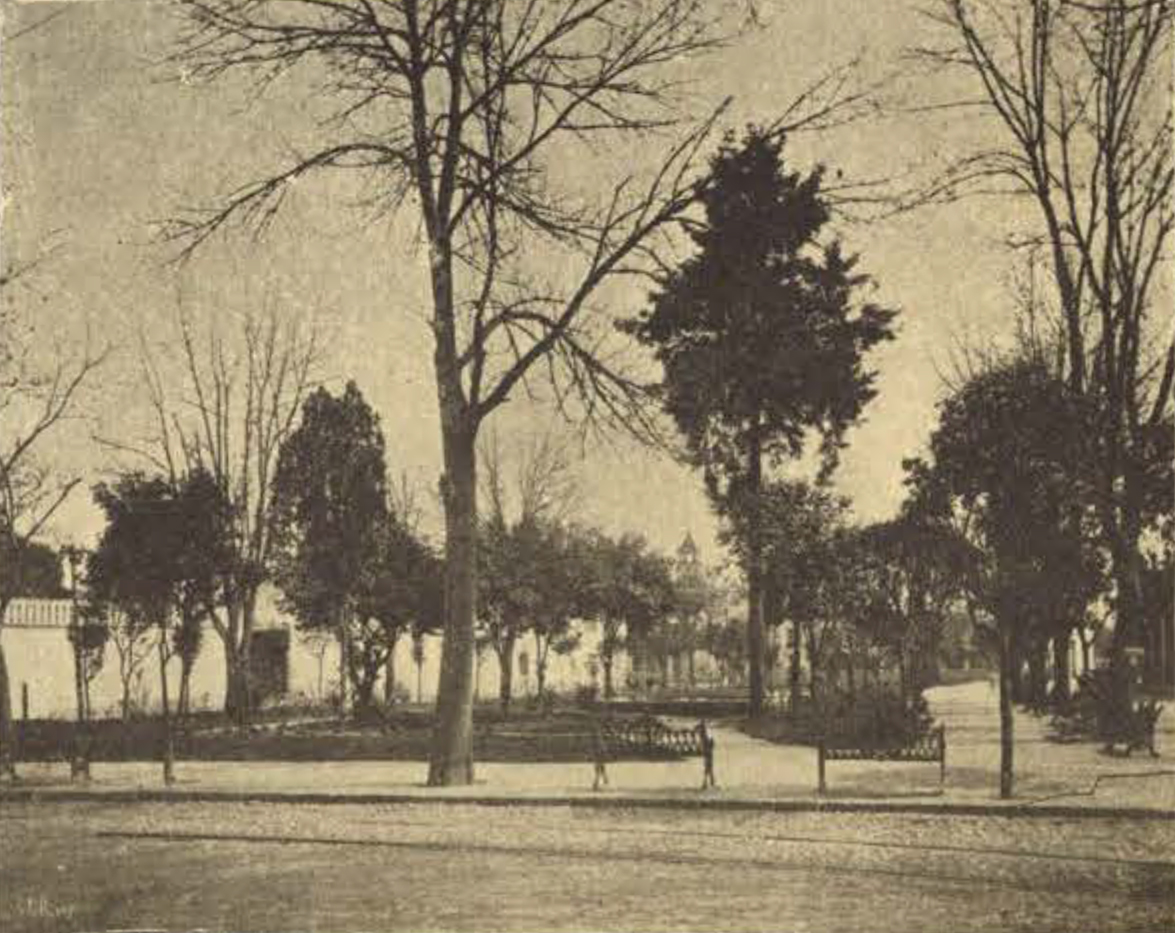
Plaza Agustín Jáuregui circa 1900

Insurgentes Mixcoac, is a neighborhood located in Benito Juárez, Mexico City. Historically, what is now Insurgentes Mixcoac, was the core of the old town, and later the municipality, of Mixcoac.

== Location ==
Insurgentes Mixcoac is located in the Benito Juárez borough in southern Mexico City.

The neighborhood is bordered by:

- Empresa street on the north, across which is Colonia Extremadura Insurgentes and Colonia San Juan
- Av. Revolución on the west, across which is Mixcoac
- Av. Río Mixcoac on the south, across which is San José Insurgentes
- Avenida de los Insurgentes Sur on the east, across which is Colonia del Valle Sur and Colonia Actipan

== History ==
Mixcoac was a Mexica settlement. According to Hernán Cortés, about 6,000 inhabitants lived there. After the Spanish conquest, in 1595, the Franciscans built the Parish of Santo Domingo de Guzmán, which became the core of the colonial town of Mixcoac, located in what is now Insurgentes Mixcoac.

The town was originally named Santo Domingo de Mixcoac. Its layout followed Spanish colonial urban standards: the homes of Spaniards were concentrated in the center, around the parish and the main square (now the Plaza Agustín Jáuregui), while the Indigenous population lived in the surrounding areas. In 1526, Hernán Cortés introduced wheat cultivation in Mixcoac, which, along with pulque, became one of the principal products of the region.

In 1824, after the Mexican War of Independence, Mixcoac was included among the constituent towns of Mexico City alongside Azcapotzalco, Iztapalapa, Tacuba, Tacubaya and Villa de Guadalupe. From 30 May to 12 June 1848, during the Mexican–American War and while Mexico City under occupation by the United States Army, President José Joaquín de Herrera established the seat of his government in the neighborhood. On 28 July 1899, by decree of Mexican president Porfirio Díaz, Mixcoac was incorporated into the district of Tacubaya.

On 26 March 1903, when Mexico City was divided into 13 municipalities, Mixcoac separated from Tacubaya and was elevated to the status of a municipality, this included the construction of a town hall to serve as the seat of the Mixcoac government in Plaza Agustín Jáuregui, next to the Parish of Santo Domingo de Guzmán. In 1928, however, Mixcoac was incorporated into the Central Department losing its status as municipality. In 1970, with the creation of the Benito Juárez borough, Insurgentes Mixcoac, along with all the neighborhoods that made up the historic town of Mixcoac, became part of this new borough.

In 2023, geologists identified the Plateros–Mixcoac fault running beneath this area, a geological feature linked to low-magnitude tremors across western Mexico City, technically known as microearthquakes and locally referred to as microsismos. The fault is believed to extend approximately 2.8 kilometers, starting west of Anillo Periférico, passing under Avenida Revolución, Patriotismo, Río Mixcoac and reaching near the Plaza Agustín Jáuregui. This discovery has prompted concern among residents, especially after a string of microsismos between late 2023 and early 2024 that caused minor structural damages to buildings in the Mixcoac area.

Insurgentes Mixcoac comprises two historical zones distinguishable by the nomenclature of their streets. The first is the core of the old Mixcoac town, around Plaza Jáuregui, with streets named after European painters and sculptors (such as Augusto Rodín, Canova). The second is the area adjacent to Avenida de los Insurgentes, developed in the 1930s, with streets named after Spanish localities (including Santander and Algeciras).

== Culture ==
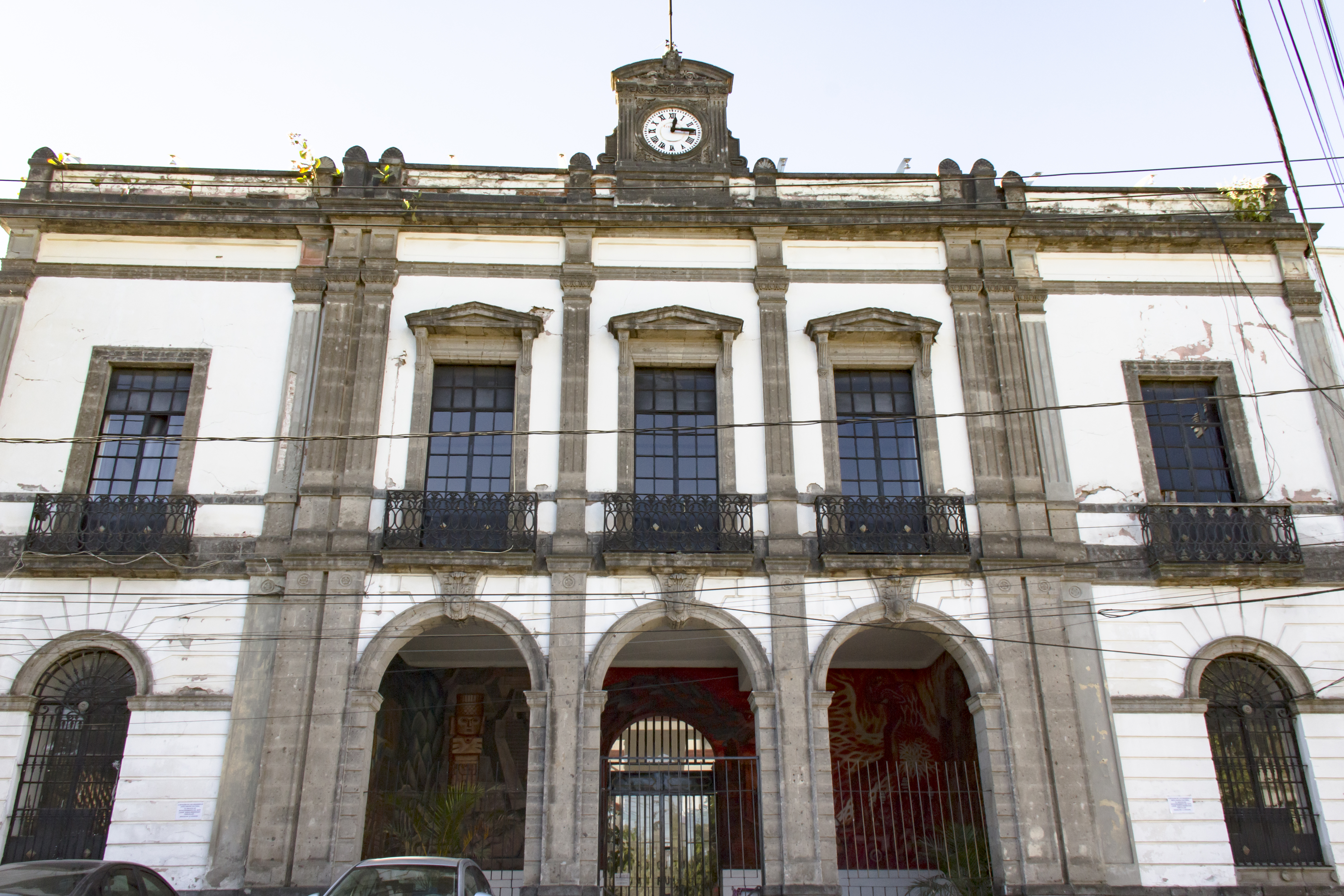
Centro Cultural Juan Rulfo, formerly the town hall of Mixcoac

Writer and journalist José Joaquín Fernández de Lizardi, author of The Mangy Parrot, was born and lived much of his life in what is now Insurgentes Mixcoac.

The neighborhood houses the Centro Cultural Juan Rulfo, a cultural centre that hosts several cultural activities such as expositions, music and dance. The house was built in 1912 by orders of Porfirio Díaz, Mexican president at the time, to serve as town hall of the Mixcoac municipality. In 1975, it was transformed into the cultural centre. The interior features a mural by Francisco Eppens titled Nuestras raíces culturales (Our cultural roots).

The Augusto Rodin street and the Plaza Agustín Jáuregui were used as a location in the 1982 Costa-Gavras film Missing, that was shot through different locations of Mexico City, used to depict the post-1973 coup d'état Chile.

== Education ==
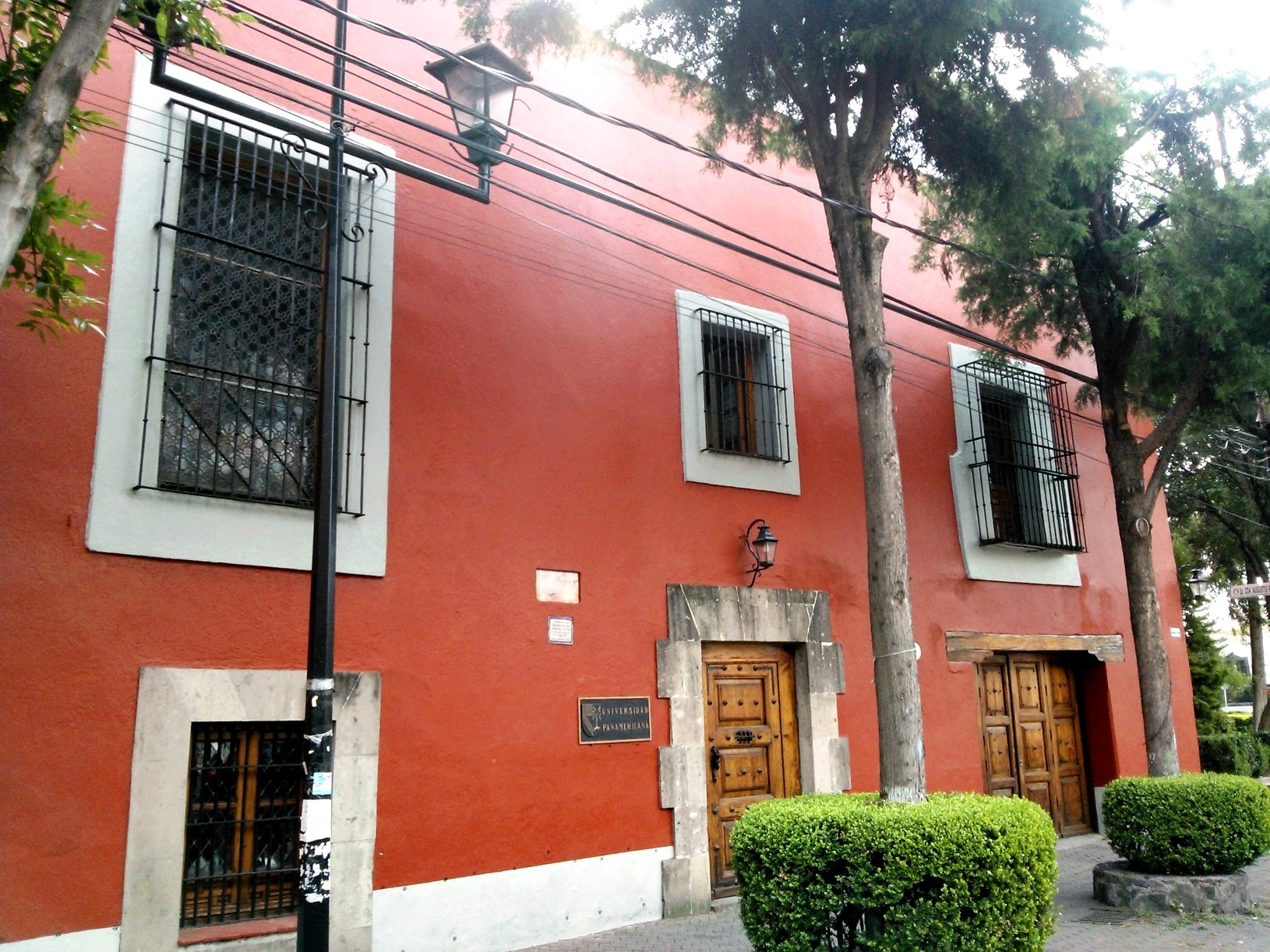
One of the buildings of the Universidad Panamericana

Insurgentes Mixcoac is home to two private universities: Simón Bolívar University and Universidad Panamericana, the latter, alma mater to former president of Mexico Enrique Peña Nieto.

The neighborhood also has a public secondary school –Escuela Secundaria Diurna No. 10 Leopoldo Ayala (Secondary School No. 10 Leopoldo Ayala)– and three public primary schools.

=== Universities ===
- Simón Bolívar University
- Universidad Panamericana

=== Primary and secondary schools ===
Secondary schools:

- Secondary School No. 10 Leopoldo Ayala

Primary schools:

- Independencia Primary School
- Profr. Federico Herrera Martínez Primary School
- Valentín Gómez Farías Primary School

== Transportation ==
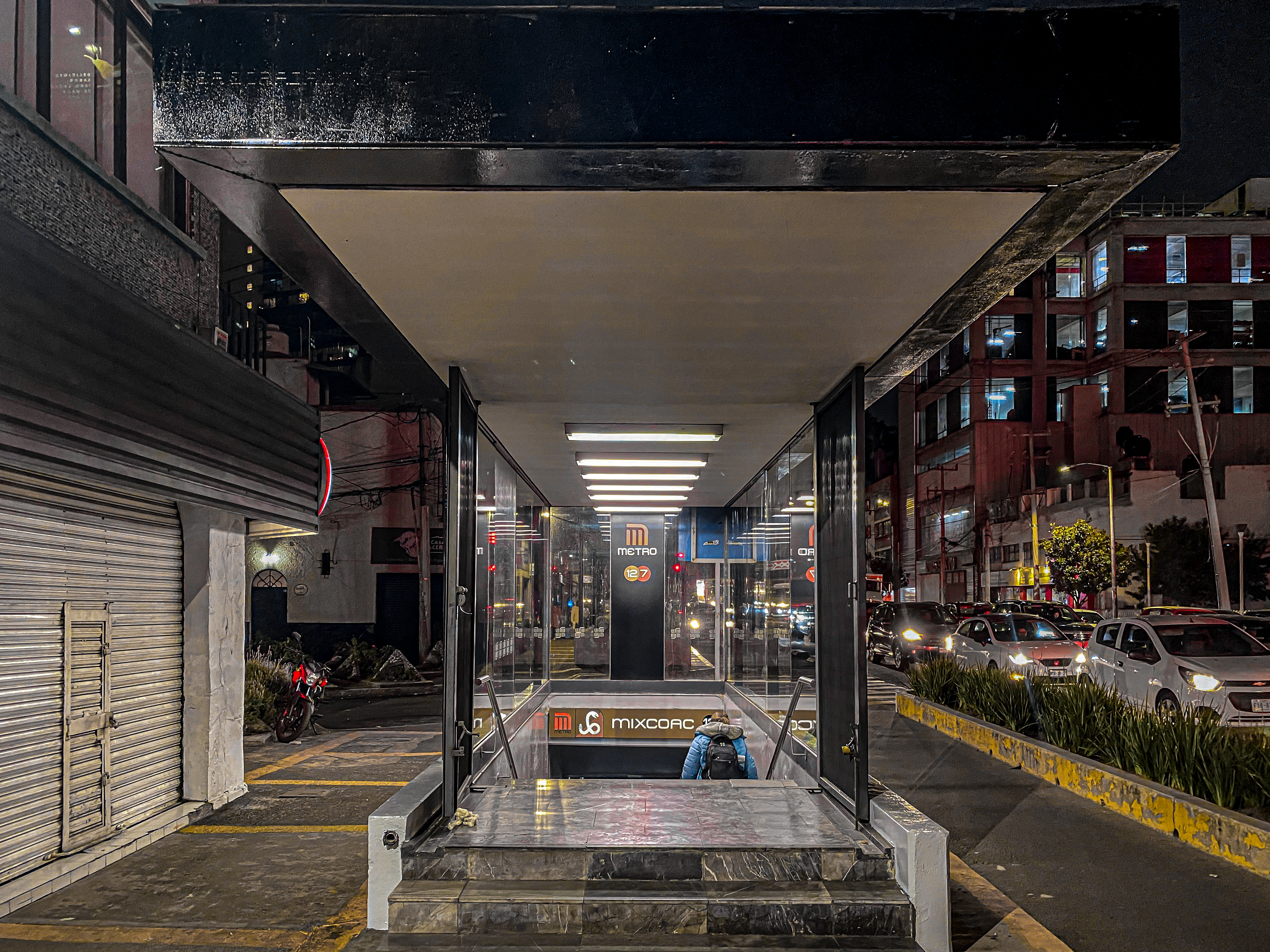
Mixcoac metro station

=== Public transportation ===
The area is served by the Mixcoac station of the Mexico City Metro lines 7 and 12, Metrobús and EcoBici bikeshare. While it is not located in the neighborhood, the Insurgentes Sur metro station is within walking distance.

Metro stations

- Mixcoac

Metrobús stations

- Félix Cuevas
- Río Churubusco

== Notable people ==
- José Joaquín Fernández de Lizardi (1776–1827), writer
- Juan Villoro (born 1956), writer
