= San José Insurgentes =

- Neighborhood of Mexico City
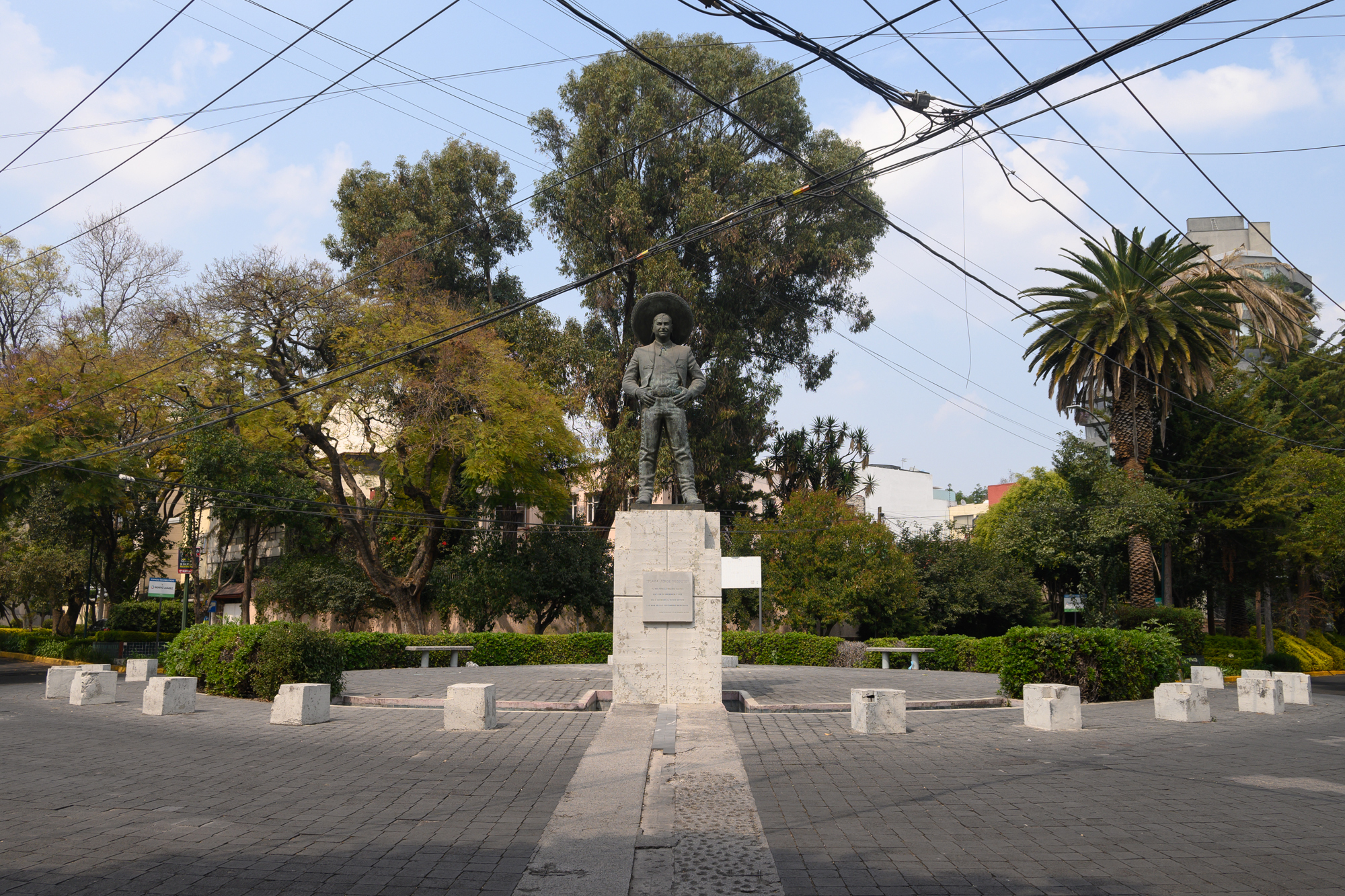
- Plaza Jorge Negrete

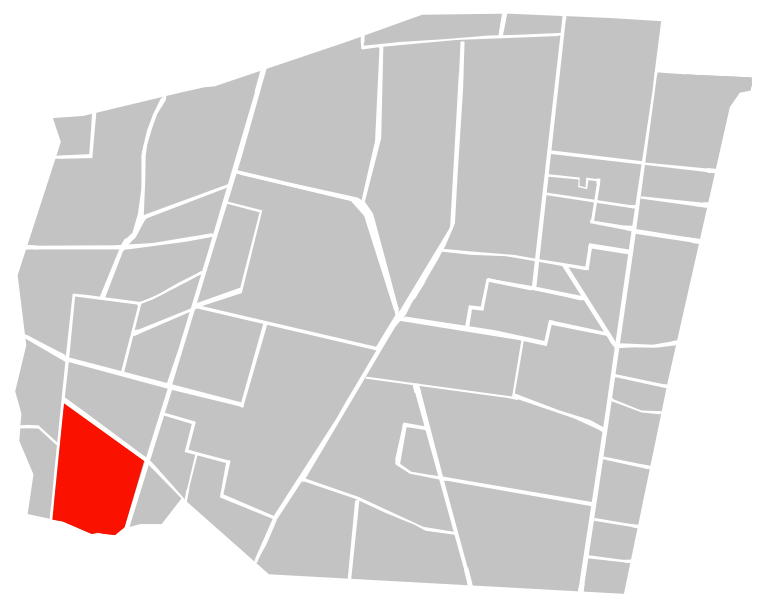
- Location of San José Insurgentes (in red) within Benito Juárez borough
- Coordinates: 19°21′59.7″N 99°11′5.69″W
- Country: Mexico
- City: Mexico City
- Municipality: Benito Juárez

Area
  - Total: 0.70 km^{2} (0.27 sq mi)

Population (2022)
  - Total: 5,958
- Postal code: 03900

San José Insurgentes is a neighborhood located in southwest Mexico City.

== Location ==
San José Insurgentes is located in the Benito Juárez borough of Mexico City.

The neighborhood is bordered by:

- Av. Río Mixcoac on the north, across which is Colonia Insurgentes Mixcoac
- Av. Revolución on the west, across which is Colonia Merced Gómez and Mixcoac
- Barranca del Muerto on the south, across which is Guadalupe Inn in the Álvaro Obregón borough
- Avenida de los Insurgentes Sur, across which is Colonia Crédito Constructor

== Description ==
San José Insurgentes is a mixed neighborhood, with both residential zones as well as office buildings, hotels and commerces. The neighborhood is home to the iconic theater Teatro de los Insurgentes.

The colonia has a public park called Parque de la Bola (English: Park of the Ball) which is located exactly at the center of the neighborhood, forming a roundabout that connects the two main avenues of the area: Félix Parra and Plateros.

== History ==
The neighborhood was developed by the Alemán family (that of Mexico's president Miguel Alemán Valdés) in the late years of the 1930s.

Since then, San José Insurgentes has been home to several public figures including president Adolfo Ruiz Cortines, actress María Félix and singer Jorge Negrete. There is a statue of Jorge Negrete located in a roundabout at the streets of Capuchinas and Del Ángel.

== Transportation ==
=== Public transportation ===
The area is served by the Mexico City Metrobús.

Metrobus stations

- Teatro Insurgentes
