= Simón Bolívar University =

Simón Bolívar University may refer to:

- Simón Bolívar University (Venezuela)
- Simón Bolívar University (Colombia)
- Simón Bolívar University (Mexico)
