= Colegio Simón Bolívar =

Colegio Simón Bolívar may refer to:

- Colegio Simón Bolívar (Acapulco)
- Colegio Simón Bolívar de la Salle Pedregal
- Colegio Simón Bolívar (Chile)
- Colegio Simón Bolívar (Col. Insurgentes, Mixcoac, Mexico City)
- Colegio Simón Bolívar (Venezuela)
