= Mexico City (former administrative division) =

Coordinates: 19°26′N 99°08′W

Mexico City Ciudad de México
- Subdivision of the Federal District of Mexico
- 1941–1970
- History
  - Established: 1941
  - Disestablished: 1970
Preceded by
Central Department (Mexico)
General Anaya (former administrative division)
Succeeded by
Miguel Hidalgo, D.F.
Benito Juárez, D.F.
Cuauhtémoc, D.F.
Venustiano Carranza, D.F.

Mexico City (Spanish: Ciudad de México) was an administrative subdivision of the Federal District from 1941 to 1970.

Mexico City was formed by merging the Central Department (itself formed from the municipalities of Mexico, Tacuba, Tacubaya and Mixcoac) and the delegación of General Anaya. In 1970, the territory of Mexico City was reorganized into the delegaciones of Miguel Hidalgo, Benito Juárez, Cuauhtémoc and Venustiano Carranza.
