= General Anaya (former administrative division) =

Former delegación of the Mexican Federal District

- Delegación of the Federal District of Mexico
- 1928–1941
- History
  - Established: 1928
  - Disestablished: 1941
| Succeeded by |
| Mexico City (former) |

General Anaya was one of the original 13 delegaciones (boroughs) of the Mexican Federal District, named after Pedro María de Anaya. In 1941 it was merged with the Central Department to form Mexico City.
