= The Mangy Parrot =

1816 novel by José Joaquín Fernández de Lizardi

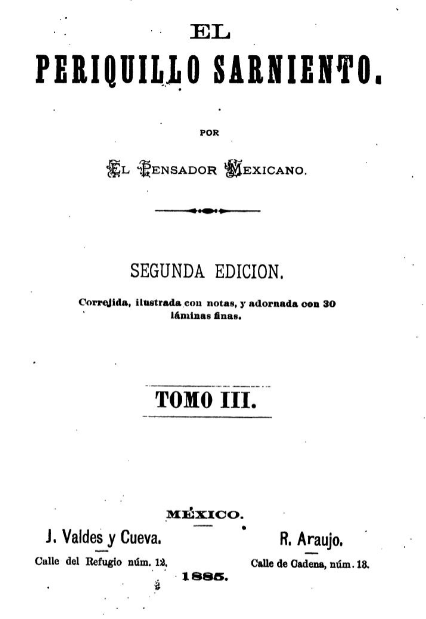
- Title page for El Periquillo Sarniento (1885 edition)
- Author: José Joaquín Fernández de Lizardi
- Original title: El Periquillo Sarniento
- Language: Spanish
- Series: none
- Genre: Novel
- Publication date: 1816–1831
- Publication place: Mexico
- Media type: Print (Hardback & Paperback)
- Pages: 720

The Mangy Parrot: The Life and Times of Periquillo Sarniento Written by himself for his Children (Spanish: El Periquillo Sarniento) by Mexican author José Joaquín Fernández de Lizardi, is generally considered the first novel written and published in Latin America. El Periquillo was written in 1816, though due to government censorship the last of four volumes was not published until 1831. The novel has been continuously in print in more than twenty editions since then.

Lizardi has been recognized as the precursor of the romantic literature in Mexico, an author product of the Enlightenment and rebellious nature. He published one of the first newspapers of insurgent Mexico, which he titled with what would later become his pseudonym, the Mexican Thinker; The printing press was closed by the viceregal government on the accusation that it perniciously stimulated the imagination of its readers and could cause another rebellion in the New Spain.

El Periquillo Sarniento can be read as a nation-building novel, written at a critical moment in the transition of Mexico (and Latin America) from colony to independence. Jean Franco has characterized the novel as "a ferocious indictment of Spanish administration in Mexico: ignorance, superstition and corruption are seen to be its most notable characteristics".

Given Lizardi's career as a pioneering Mexican journalist, his novel can also be read as a journal of opinion in the guise of a picaresque novel. It follows the adventures of Pedro Sarmiento (nicknamed "Periquillo Sarniento" or "Mangy Parrot" by his disreputable friends), who, like Lizardi himself, is the son of a Criollo family from Mexico City with more pretensions to "good birth" than means of support. The story begins with Periquillo's birth and miseducation and continues through his endless attempts to make an unearned living, as a student, a friar, a gambler, a notary, a barber, a pharmacist, a doctor, a beggar, a soldier, a count, and a thief, until late in life he sees the light and begins to lead an honest life.

At every point along the way, Lizardi uses the deathbed voice of the elderly and repentant Periquillo to lambast the social conditions that led to his wasted life. In this, the novelist mimics the role of the early nineteenth-century journalist more interested in arguing opinions than relating mundane incidents. The marriage of slapstick humor with moralizing social commentary, established in El Periquillo, remained a constant in the Mexican novels that followed on its heels throughout the nineteenth century. Agustín Yáñez justifies this often criticized "moralizing" tendency in Lizardi as "a constant in the artistic production of Mexico... and moreover, it is a constant in Mexican life".

At the same time, as critics have noted, Lizardi's interest in depicting the realities and reproducing the speech of Mexicans from all social classes make his novel a bridge between the inherited picaresque mold that forms its overt structure and the costumbrista novels of the nineteenth century.

== Place in Lizardi's Work ==
José Joaquín Fernández de Lizardi is emblematic of the generation of intellectuals, artists, and writers who led Mexico into the modern era. His own life history resonates with the ambivalences and outright contradictions of a world between colonial rule and independence. His writings — four novels, several fables, two plays, dozens of poems, over 250 articles and pamphlets — are important in three ways: as artistic expressions in themselves; as texts that contributed in vital ways to the intellectual life of Mexico early in its independence; and as windows into the daily life of that period.

Of Lizardi's many published works, El Periquillo Sarniento remains the most important. It typifies the dual impulse of his writing: to entertain and to edify. It is also a lively, comic novel that captures much of the reality of Mexico in 1816. In his subsequent novels Noches tristes (1818) and La Quijotita y su prima (1818–19), Lizardi's didactic side won out over his will to entertain. La Quijotita in particular is an exercise in moralizing, populated with flat characters whose function is to model particular foibles or virtues. Lizardi's last novel, Don Catrín de la Fachenda (1820), has on the contrary been held up by some critics as superior to El Periquillo. In Don Catrín, Lizardi took pains to respond to critics of the overt moralizing in his first novel. The result is a slimmed-down, artistically unified, more ironic, and darker picaresque. Yet El Periquillo retains its importance. As Antonio Benítez-Rojo writes, citing Benedict Anderson's use of El Periquillo as an exemplar of the anti-colonial novel, "the illusion of accompanying Periquillo along the roads and through the villages and towns of the viceroyalty helped awaken in the novel's readers the desire for nationness." Don Catrín "is artistically superior to El Periquillo Sarniento," Benítez-Rojo continues, "yet for all its defects the latter, because of its great vitality, is a major work of Mexican literature."

Finally, El Periquillo has the virtue of being the first, as Lizardi himself noted: "I am far from believing that I have written a masterpiece that is free from defects: it has many that I recognize, and must have others still that I have not noticed; but it also has one undeniable distinction, which is that of being the first novel that has been written in this country by an American in three hundred years." Because of its status as the first novel written by a Latin American and one emulated by generations of Mexican novelists, El Periquillo Sarniento appears on many "must-read" lists for graduate programs in Latin American literature, and it is of equal interest to students of Latin American history.

== Print editions of El Periquillo in Spanish and English ==
- The most widely available edition in Spanish of El Periquillo Sarniento, edited and annotated by Jefferson Rea Spell, is published in Mexico by Editorial Porrúa (many editions since 1949).
- An excellent new edition, edited and annotated by Carmen Ruiz Barrionuevo, was published in Madrid by Ediciones Cátedra in 1997, but has since gone out of print.
- A partial translation of El Periquillo Sarniento into English was published in 1942 by Doubleday under the title The Itching Parrot. Katherine Anne Porter, the translator, concentrated on the lively picaresque novel and stripped it of its journalistic pamphlet parts.
- A new and unabridged English translation by David Frye, The Mangy Parrot (2004), is published by Hackett Publishing Company. ISBN 0-87220-735-8
- An abridgment of the Hackett translation is published under the title The Mangy Parrot, Abridged (2005). ISBN 0-87220-670-X

== Online editions ==
- The Biblioteca Virtual has a digital version available in Spanish (Vol. i–iv) at

(This article was contributed and corrected by the translator of the Hackett edition, and contains much of the same information that will be found in the preface to that translation.)
