= José Joaquín Fernández de Lizardi =

Mexican writer and political journalist (1776–1827

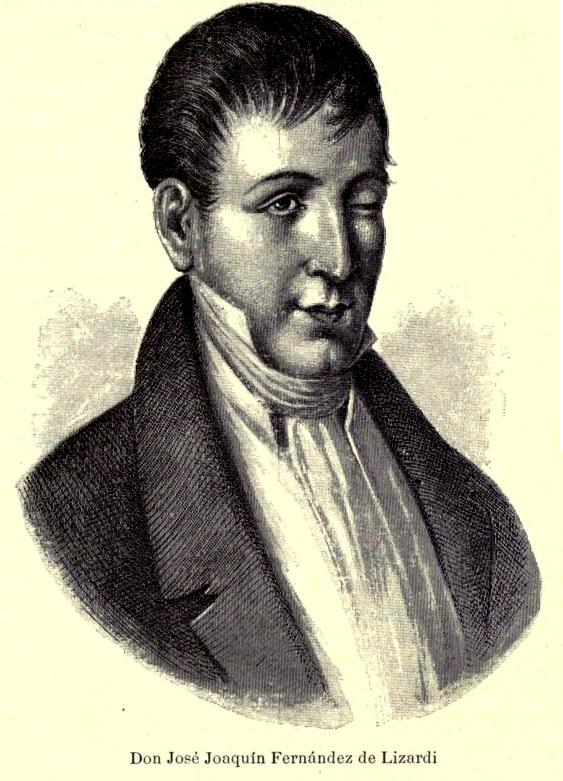
- Portrait of José Joaquín Fernández de Lizardi
- Born: 15 November 1776; Mexico City, Viceroyalty of New Spain
- Died: 21 June 1827 (aged 50); Mexico City, Mexico
- Cause of death: Tuberculosis
- Occupations: Writer; journalist
- Writing career
- Pen name: El Pensador Mexicano
- Notable work: El Periquillo Sarniento
- Literary movement: Mexican Enlightenment

José Joaquín Eugenio Fernández de Lizardi Gutiérrez (15 November 1776 – 21 June 1827), commonly known as José Joaquín Fernández de Lizardi (under the pseudonym of El Pensador Mexicano), was a Mexican writer, journalist, and political thinker known for his pioneering role in Latin American literature and early journalism in the 19th century. He is widely recognized as one of the first novelists in the Americas, particularly for his novel El Periquillo Sarniento (The Mangy Parrot), which began publication in 1816 and is considered the first novel written and published in Latin America. The work blends satire, moral commentary, and social criticism in a narrative influenced by the Enlightenment ideals of reason and reform. Lizardi lived through the final years of New Spain and the early stages of Mexican independence. A proponent of liberalism and freedom of the press, he used literature and journalism as vehicles for advocating educational reform, denouncing corruption, and challenging authoritarianism and social inequality. In 1812, taking advantage of press freedoms briefly granted under the Constitution of Cádiz. Through this outlet, he published critiques of colonial administration and clericalism, which led to repeated episodes of censorship and even imprisonment. Despite political pressures, Fernández de Lizardi remained committed to intellectual freedom, using his writing as a tool for public engagement and reform. His legacy endures in Mexican literature and political thought as a forerunner of critical journalism and liberal values in early 19th-century Mexico.

== Life ==
Lizardi, as he is generally known, was born in Mexico City when it was still the capital of the colonial Spanish viceroyalty of New Spain. His father, Manuel Fernández Lizalde, practiced as a physician in and around Mexico City, and who for a time supplemented the family income by writing. Likewise, his mother, Bárbara Gutiérrez, came from a family of modest but "decent" means; her own father had been a bookseller in the city of Puebla.

The death of Lizardi's father after a short illness in 1798 forced him to leave his studies at the Colegio de San Ildefonso and enter the civil service as a minor magistrate in the Taxco-Acapulco region. He married María Dolores Orendain in Taxco in 1805.

The necessity of providing for a growing family led Lizardi to supplement his meager income as his father had: by writing. He began his literary career in 1809 by publishing a poem in honor of Ferdinand VII of Spain. Though Ferdinand VII later became a target of nationalist rage among pro-independence Mexicans because of his tendency toward despotism, Lizardi's politics were still unknown in 1808, the year of the Napoleonic invasion of Spain. With Napoleon's brother-in-law usurping the Spanish throne and the legitimate king in exile, raising a public voice in his favor was a patriotic stance for a Mexican intellectual, and in line with Lizardi's later proto-nationalist views.

At the beginning of the Mexican War of Independence in November 1810, José María Morelos's insurgent forces fought their way into Taxco, where Lizardi, serving as Teniente de Justica, headed the local government as acting subdelegado (the highest provincial government position in the colonial system). After an initial insurgent victory, Lizardi tried to play both sides: he turned over the city's armory to the insurgents, but he also informed the viceroy, Francisco Javier Venegas, of rebel movements on November 11. Judged in the context of his later writings, these actions do not appear hypocritical. Lizardi was always supportive of the intellectual aims and reformist politics of the insurgents, but was equally opposed to war and bloodshed. By peacefully capitulating Taxco to the insurgents, he aimed to avoid loss of life in the city under his leadership. Following the royalist recapture of Taxco in January 1811, Lizardi was taken prisoner as a rebel sympathizer and sent with the other prisoners of war to Mexico City. There he appealed successfully to the viceroy, arguing that he had acted only to protect Taxco and its citizens from harm.

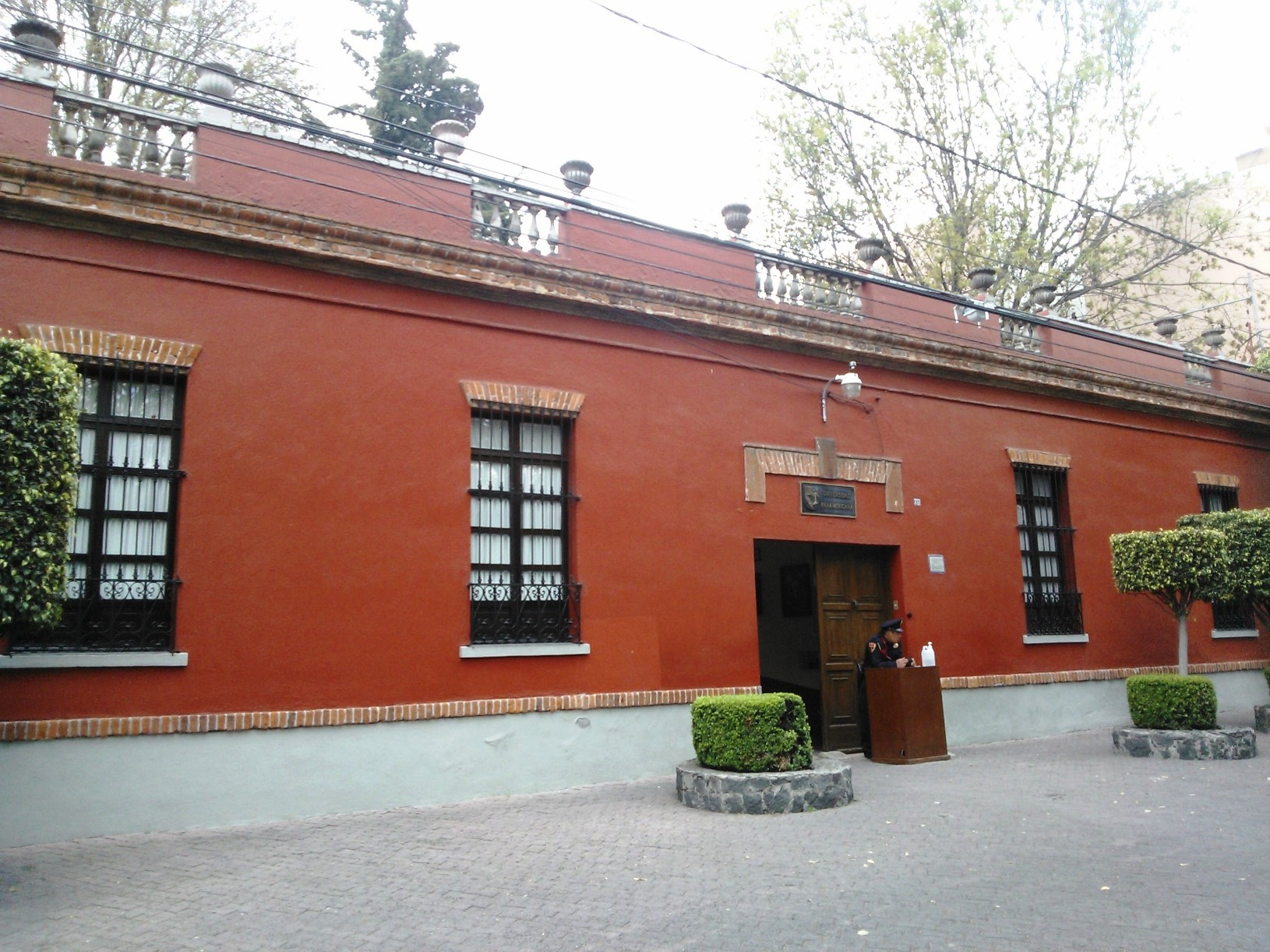
House of José Joaquín Fernández de Lizardi in Mixcoac, Mexico City.

Lizardi, now free from prison and living in Mexico City, had lost his job and his possessions. He turned to full-time writing and publishing to support his family, publishing more than twenty lightly satirical poems in broadsheets and pamphlets in the course of a year. After limited freedom of the press was declared in Mexico on October 5, 1812 (see Spanish Constitution of 1812), Lizardi quickly organized one of the first non-governmental newspapers in the country. The first issue of his El Pensador Mexicano ("The Mexican Thinker", a title he adopted as his own pseudonym) came out on October 9, just four days after press freedom was allowed.

In his journalism, Lizardi turned from the light social criticism of his earlier broadsheets to direct commentary on the political problems of the day, attacking the autocratic tendencies of the viceregal government and supporting the liberal aspirations represented by the democratic Cortes of Cádiz in Spain. His articles show the influence of Enlightenment ideas derived from clandestine readings of forbidden books by Voltaire, Rousseau, and Diderot, a hazardous route to take in those hopeful but uncertain times. In the ninth issue of El Pensador Mexicano (December 1812), Lizardi attacked viceroy Francisco Javier Venegas directly, resulting in his arrest. He continued to issue the paper from his jail cell, but he dismayed pro-independence readers by suppressing his sympathies for the insurgents and muting critiques of the system that had imprisoned him. When a new viceroy, Félix María Calleja, was named in March 1813, Lizardi lavished praise on him; the viceroy responded by freeing Lizardi after seven months of jail.

Lizardi continued to write and publish his periodicals after his release, but increased attention from royalist censors and the Inquisition muted his critical tone. When victory over Napoleon in Europe led to the reestablishment of an authoritarian monarchy, the overthrow of the Spanish Cortes, and the abrogation of freedom of the press in 1814, Lizardi turned from journalism to literature as a means of expressing his social criticism. This social and political conjuncture led to Lizardi's writing and publication of El Periquillo Sarniento, which is commonly recognized as the first novel by a Mexican and the first Latin American novel.

Though it is a novel in form and scope, El Periquillo Sarniento resembled Lizardi's periodicals in several ways: he printed and sold it in weekly chapter installments throughout 1816; he wove extensive commentary on the political and moral climate of Mexico into the narration; like his periodicals, the novel was eventually halted by censorship. The first three volumes slipped past the censors, as Lizardi had hoped they would in their fictionalized guise, but Lizardi's direct attack on the institution of slavery (in the form called Asiento) in the fourth volume was enough to have the publication stopped. The final sixteen chapters of El Periquillo were only published in 1830–1831, after Lizardi's death, and a decade following Mexican independence. Lizardi's other works of fiction also appeared by installments during the years of renewed royalist repression that lasted until 1820: Fábulas (collection of fables, 1817), Noches tristes (novel, 1818), La Quijotita y su prima (novel, 1818–1819) and Don Catrín de la Fachenda (completed 1820, published 1832).

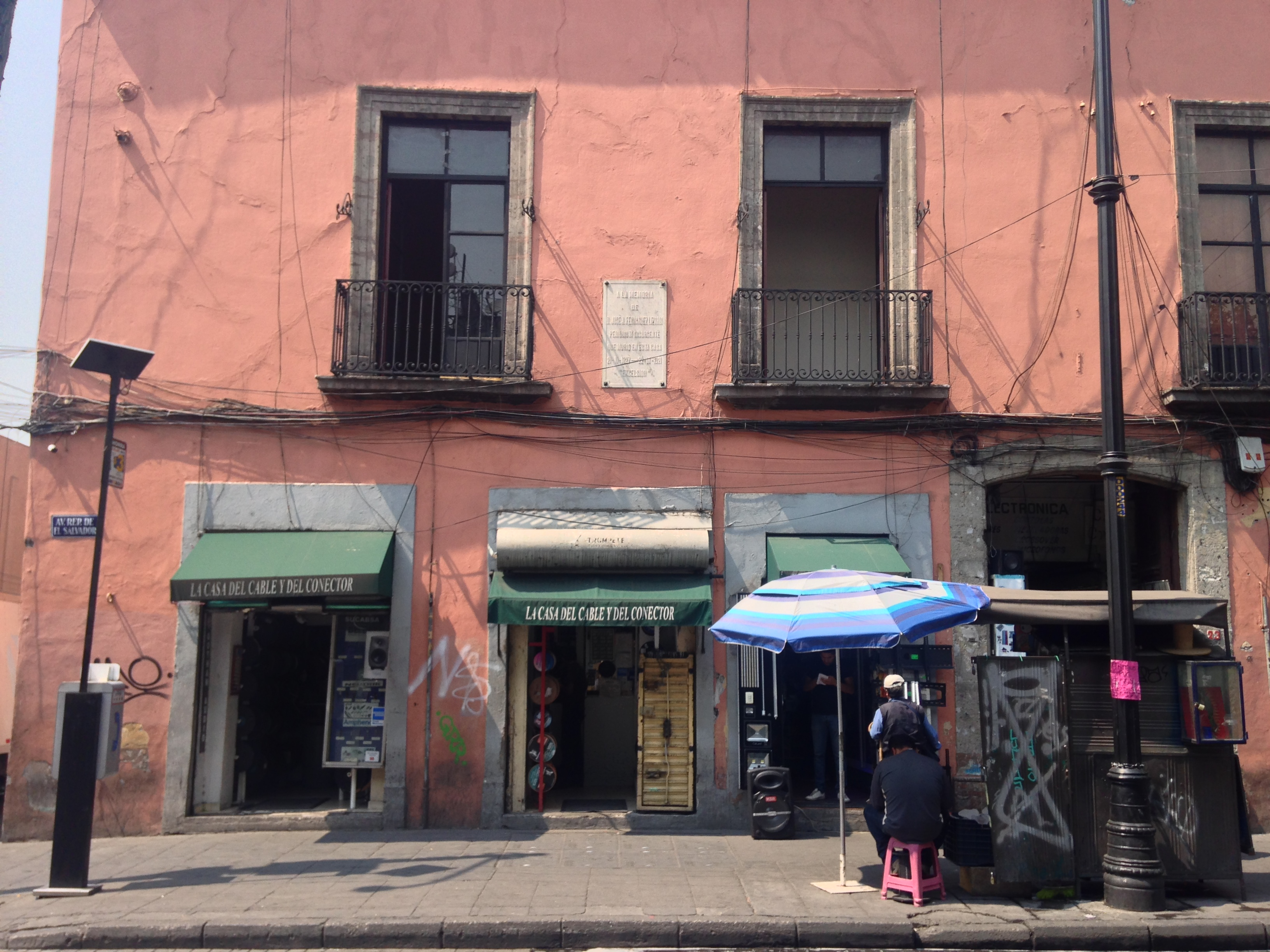
House in Mexico City where José Joaquín Fernández de Lizardi died.

With the re-establishment of the liberal Spanish constitution in 1820, Lizardi returned to journalism, only to be attacked, imprisoned, and censored again by a changing roster of political enemies. Royalists repressed him until the independence of Mexico in 1821; centralists opposed to his federalist leanings attacked him after independence; throughout, he suffered attacks by the Catholic hierarchy, opposed to his Masonic leanings.

Lizardi died of tuberculosis in 1827 at the age of 50. Because of his family's extreme poverty he was buried in an anonymous grave, without the epitaph he had hoped would be engraved on his tombstone: "Here lie the ashes of the Mexican Thinker, who did the best he could for his country."

== Novels ==
- The Mangy Parrot (1816–31)
- Sad Nights and Joyful Days (1818–31)
- Quixotita and her Cousin Sister (1818–19)
- The Life and Deeds of the Famous Knight, Don Catrín de la Fachenda (1820–32)

== Note ==
This article is largely based on a revised version of the brief biography of Lizardi in the preface to the English translation of The Mangy Parrot (Indianapolis, 2004), which is used here by permission of the author. The primary work on the life of Lizardi is Jefferson Rea Spell's The Life and Works of José Joaquín Fernández de Lizardi (Philadelphia: University of Pennsylvania Press, 1931), reprinted in his Bridging the Gap: Articles on Mexican Literature (Mexico City: Editorial Libros de México, 1971, pp. 99–141).
