= Central Department (Mexico) =

Central Department Departmento Central
- Subdivision of the Federal District of Mexico
- 1928–1941
- History
  - Established: 1928
  - Disestablished: 1941
Preceded by
Mexico (municipality)
Tacuba (Mexico)
Tacubaya (municipality)
Mixcoac (municipality)
Succeeded by
Mexico City (former)

The Central Department (Spanish: Departamento Central) was an administrative subdivision of the Mexican Federal District. It was formed in 1928 from the former municipalities of Mexico, Tacuba, Tacubaya and Mixcoac. In 1941, the delegación of General Anaya was merged with the Central Department to form Mexico City.
