= Colegio Simón Bolívar (Simon Bolivar University) =

Private school in Mexico City, Mexico

Colegio Simón Bolívar (CSB) is a private school in Colonia Insurgentes, Mixcoac, Benito Juárez, Mexico City. It serves kindergarten through senior high school (preparatoria). It is affiliated with Simón Bolívar University (USB).
