= Mixcoac =

Neighborhood in Mexico City

Coordinates: 19.3761°N 99.1877°W

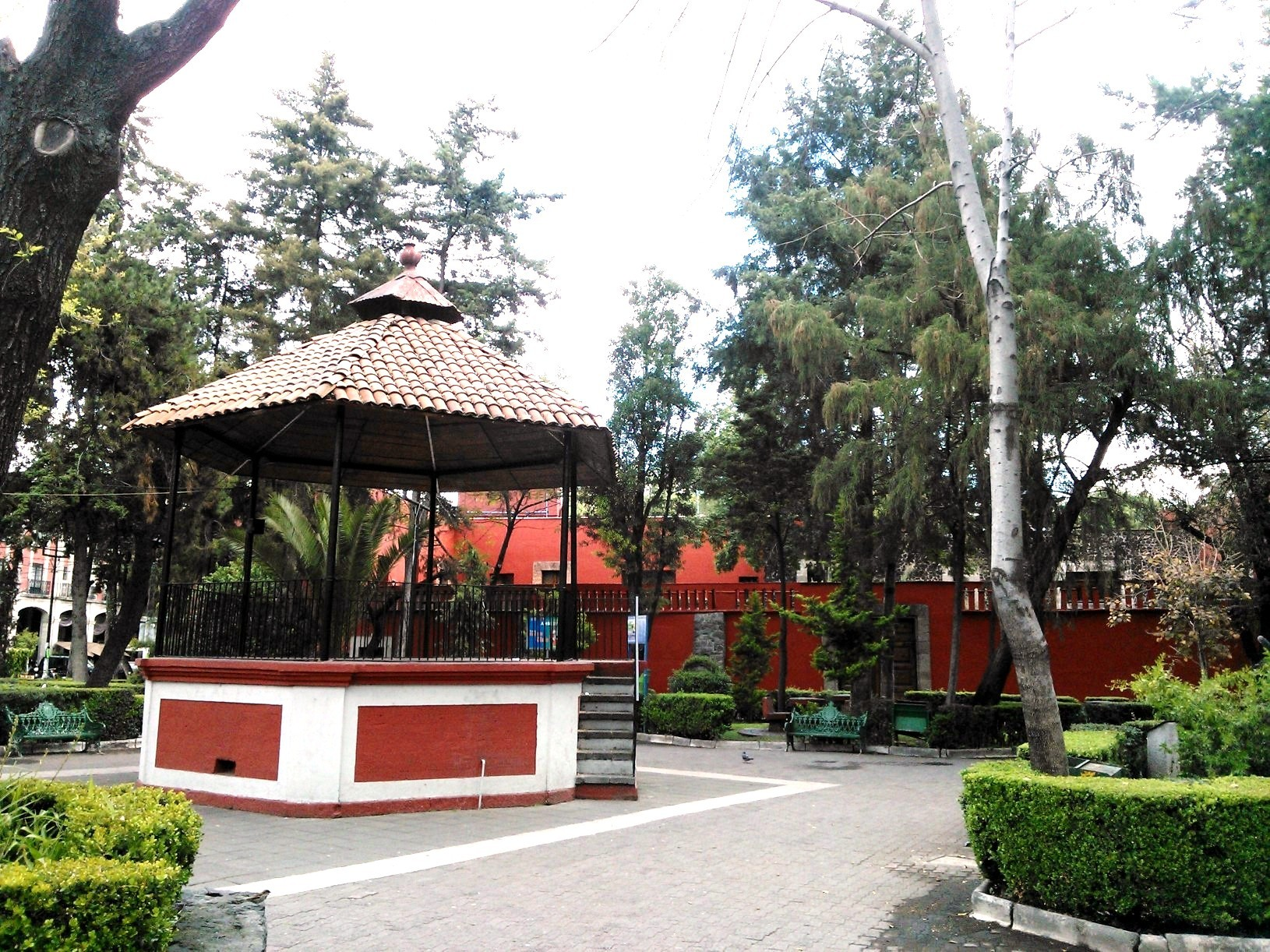
Plaza Jáuregui

Mixcoac is an area of southern Mexico City which used to be a separate town and municipality within the Mexican Federal District until it was made part of Mexico City proper (the Departamento Central at the time) in 1928.

Mixcoac consists of the colonias (official neighborhoods) of Nonoalco, San Juan, Extremadura Insurgentes, Mixcoac, and Insurgentes Mixcoac and is part of the borough of Benito Juárez. It is bounded by Avenida de los Insurgentes to the east and the Periférico freeway to the west, south of Colonia Nápoles and San Pedro de los Pinos.

It is a designated Barrio Mágico ("magical neighborhood") of Mexico City.

== History ==
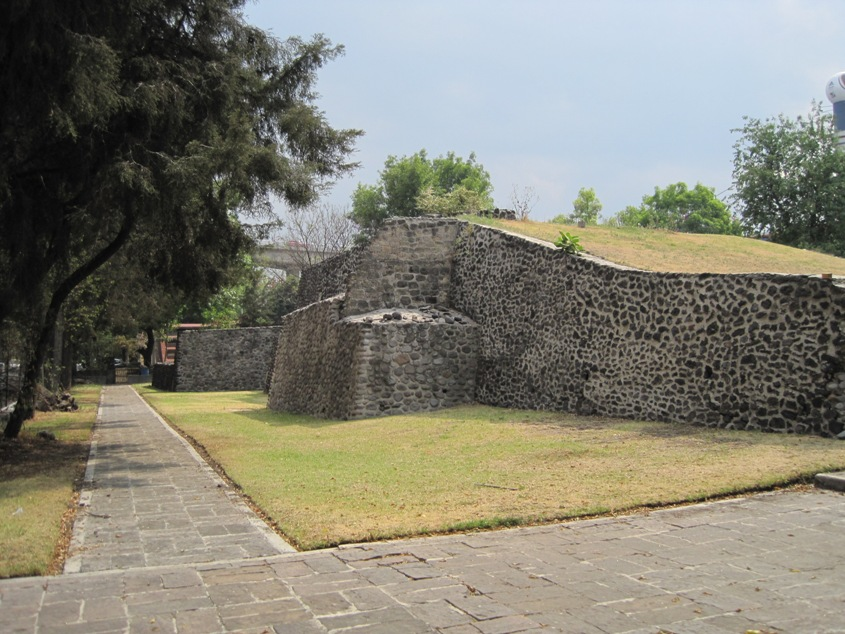
Archaeological site of Mixcoac

The name "Mixcoac" comes from the Nahuatl language mixtli (cloud), coatl (serpent), co (in), and means "Place of the Cloud Serpent", alluding to the Milky Way and the god Mixcóatl.

Before the Spanish conquest there was a small settlement on the edge of Lake Texcoco, the lake that surrounded the island city of Tenochtitlan, today Mexico City. The ruins of the settlement, occupied between about 900 AD and 1521 AD, can be seen at the Mixcoac archeological site.

After the Conquest, ranchos and haciendas were established in the area, as well as a textile factory which is today forms part of the Mexico City campus of the Universidad Panamericana. In the late 19th century, wealthy people from Mexico City began establishing summer residences here and in nearby towns such as Tacubaya, San Ángel and Coyoacán. In 1910 the large La Castañeda psychiatric hospital opened, functioning until 1967. In 1928 the Municipality of Mixcoac was absorbed into Mexico City proper, becoming part of a new Departamento Central within the Mexican Federal District.

In 1910 the municipality had 21,812 residents with about 1900 dwellings. In the following decades the ranchos and haciendas were subdivided and the area became contiguous with the rest of the Mexico City urban area.

Nonetheless the historic center of Mixcoac around the main square is largely intact.

== Points of interest ==
Historic buildings and sites that still exist include:

- Glorieta de Goya roundabout and park with a statue of Álvaro Obregón
- Old textile factory (Antiguo Obraje de Mixcoac) - Universidad Panamericana: previously a silk clothing factory and now part of the university
- Centro Cultural Juan Rulfo: former city hall built under President Porfirio Díaz, now a cultural center
- Casa de la Campana ("House of the Bell")
- Plaza Jaurégui: Main square
- House of Joaquín Fernández de Lizardi
- Galería Arte Quimera

Churches include the Parroquia de Santo Domingo de Guzmán (a.k.a. Ex Convento y Parroquia de Santo Domingo de Guzmán y Capilla de la Virgen del Rayo, Ex-Convent and Parish of Santo Domingo de Guzmán and Chapel of the Virgin of the Ray), first founded in 1595.

The Manacar tower and shopping center is in colonia Insurgentes Mixcoac at the corner of Avenida Insurgentes and the Circuito Interior freeway.

== Transportation ==
Mixcoac is served by the Mixcoac station of the Mexico City metro, lines 7 and 12.

== Education ==
The Universidad Panamericana main campus is located in historic buildings in the historic heart of Insurgentes Mixcoac. Simón Bolívar University is in Mixcoac, as is its affiliated private primary and secondary school, Colegio Simón Bolívar.

Colegio La Salle Simón Bolívar, another private school, has two campuses in Mixcoac.

The Mixcoac Campus of Colegio Williams is also in Mixcoac.

== Notable residents ==
Notable residents of Mixcoac have included poets Octavio Paz and Hart Crane, chemist Luis E. Miramontes co-inventor of the progestin norethisterone used in one of the first three oral contraceptives, Mexican president Valentín Gómez Farías, director José Solé, and authors José Joaquín Fernández de Lizardi, whose house is used for classrooms of the Universidad Panamericana and Katherine Anne Porter, the American story writer and novelist, who later translated one of Lizardi's works.

== Gallery ==
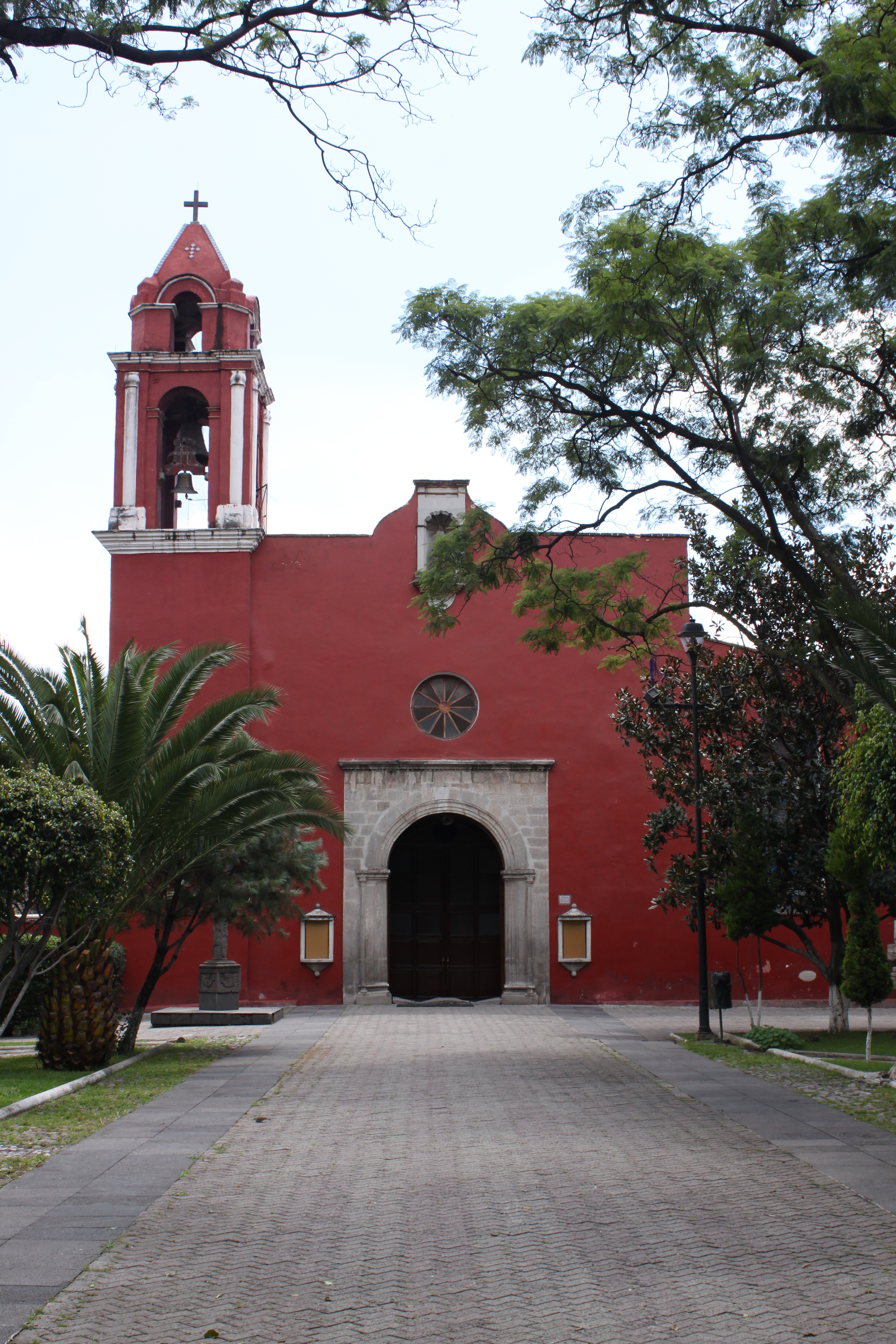
Parroquía de Santo Domingo de Guzmán

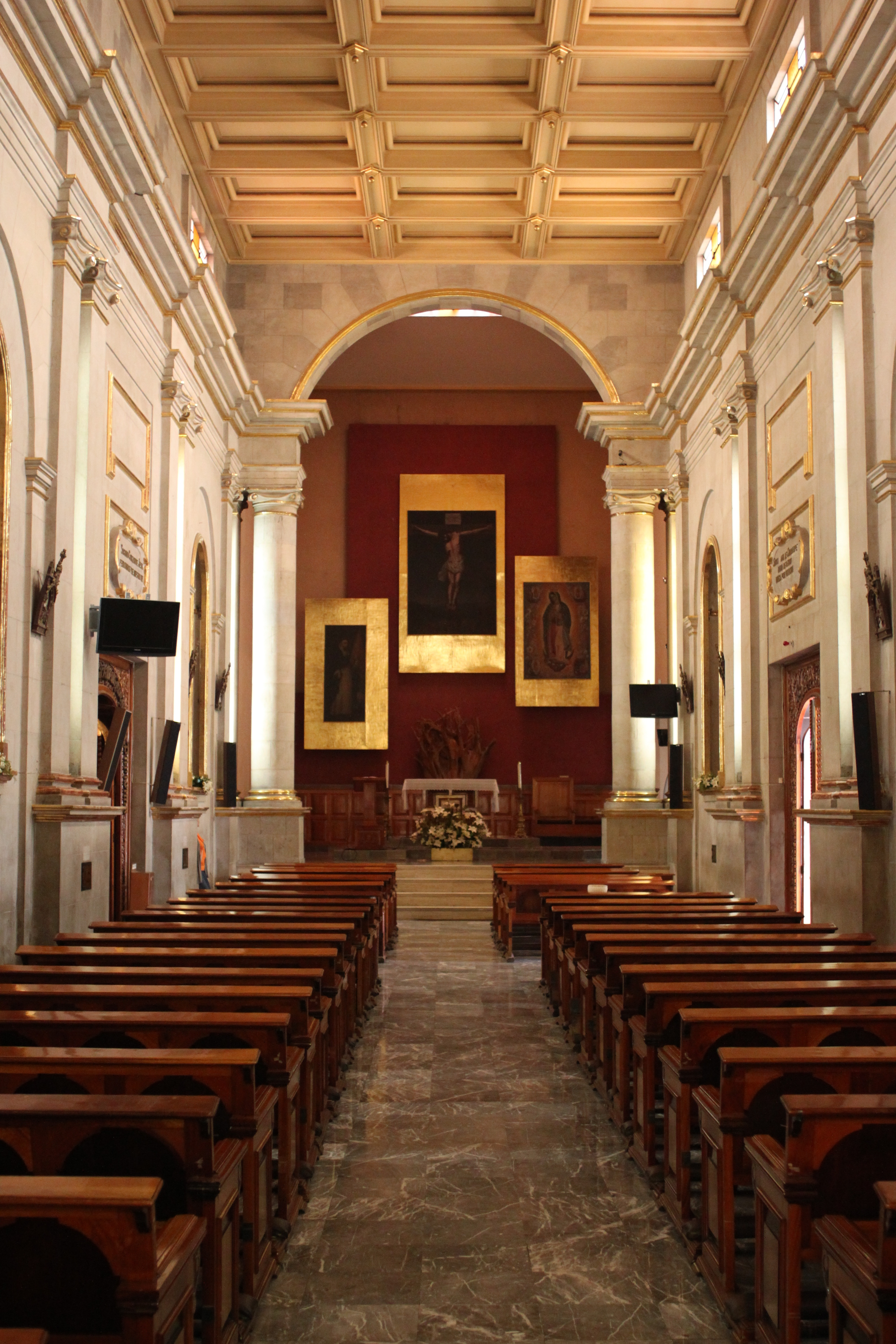
Interior of the Parroquía

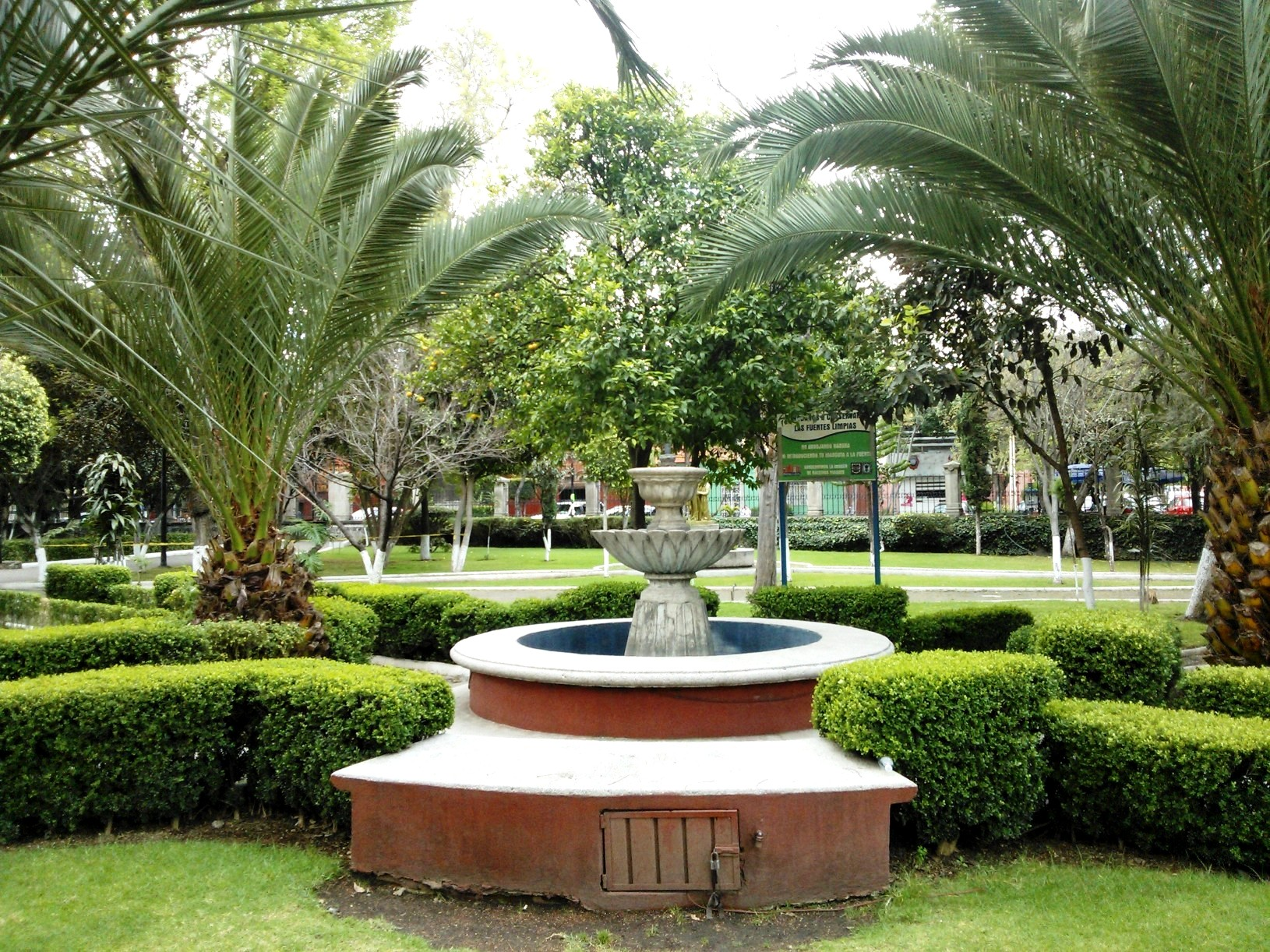
Atrium of the Parroquía

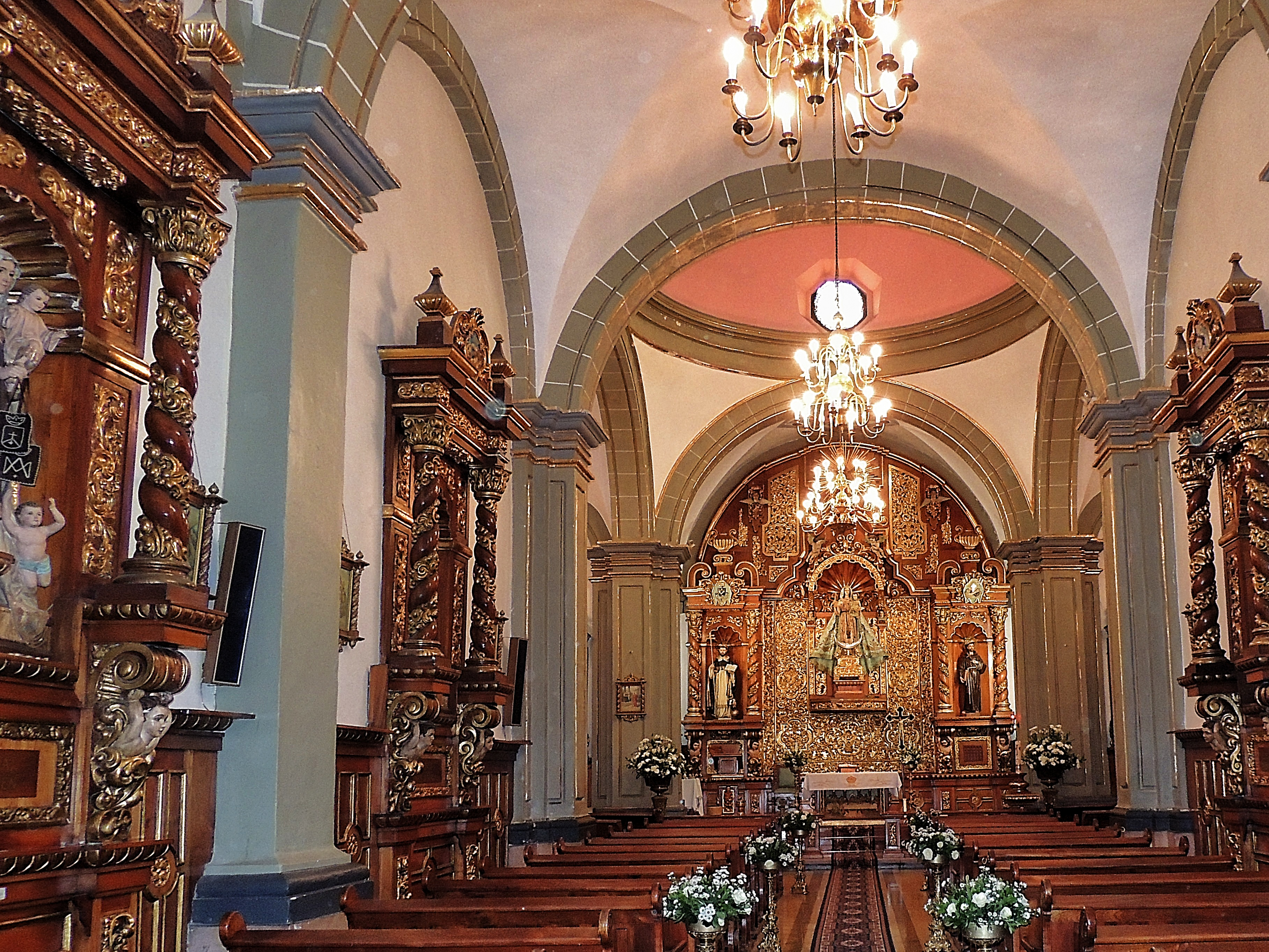
Capilla de la Virgen del Rayo

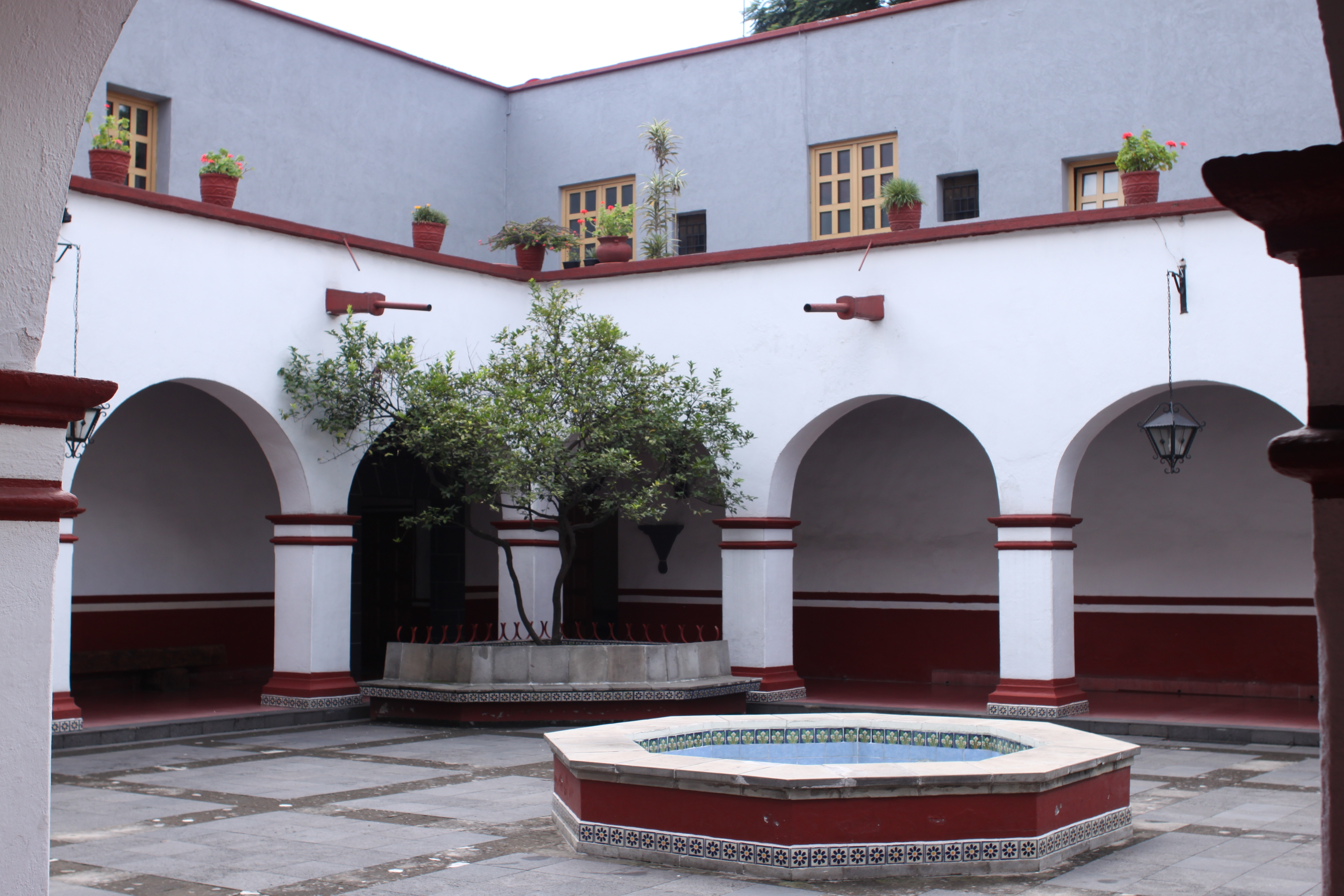
Claustro del ex-convento de Santo Domingo

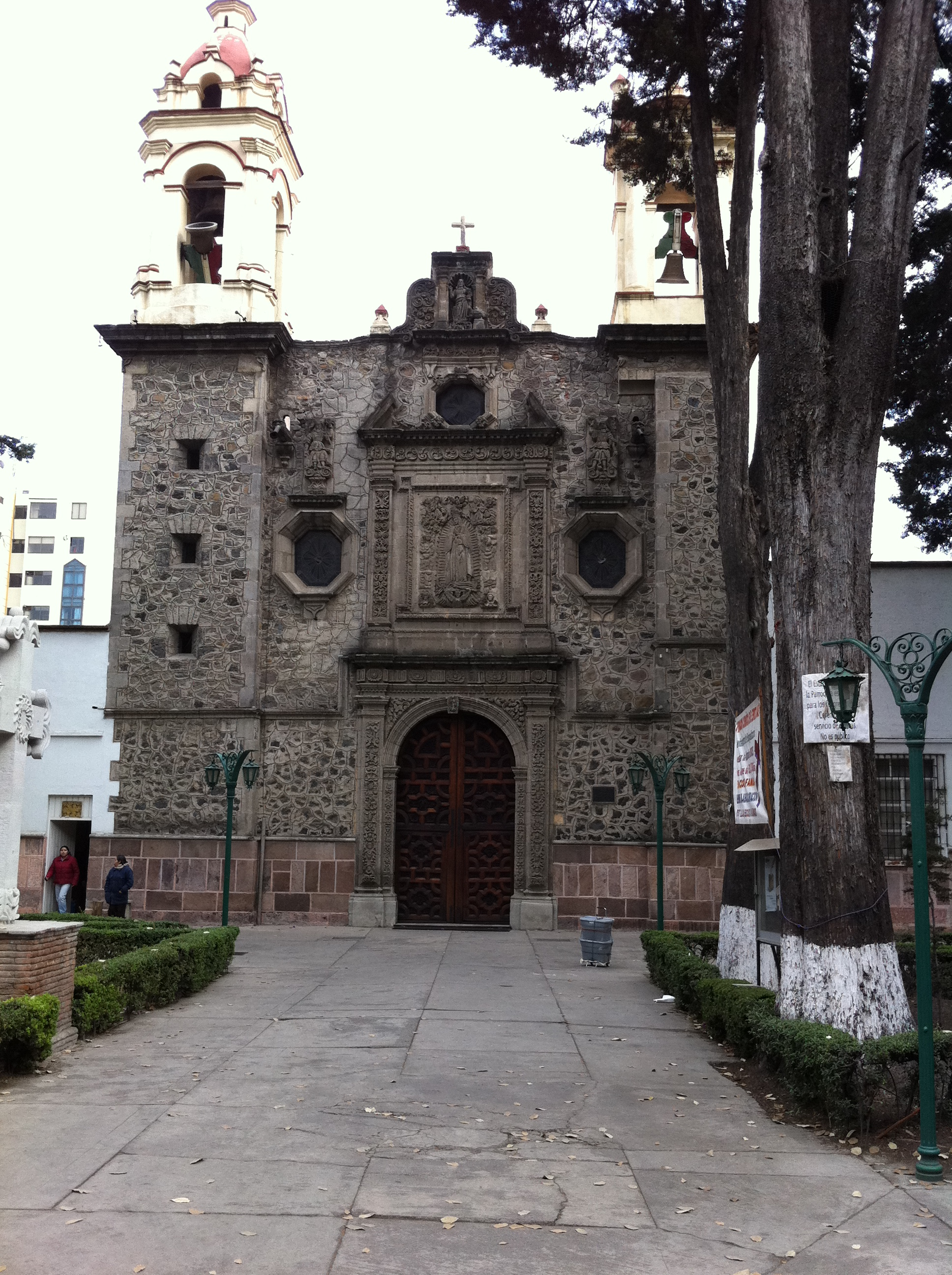
Parroquia de San Juan Evangelista y nuestra señora de Guadalupe

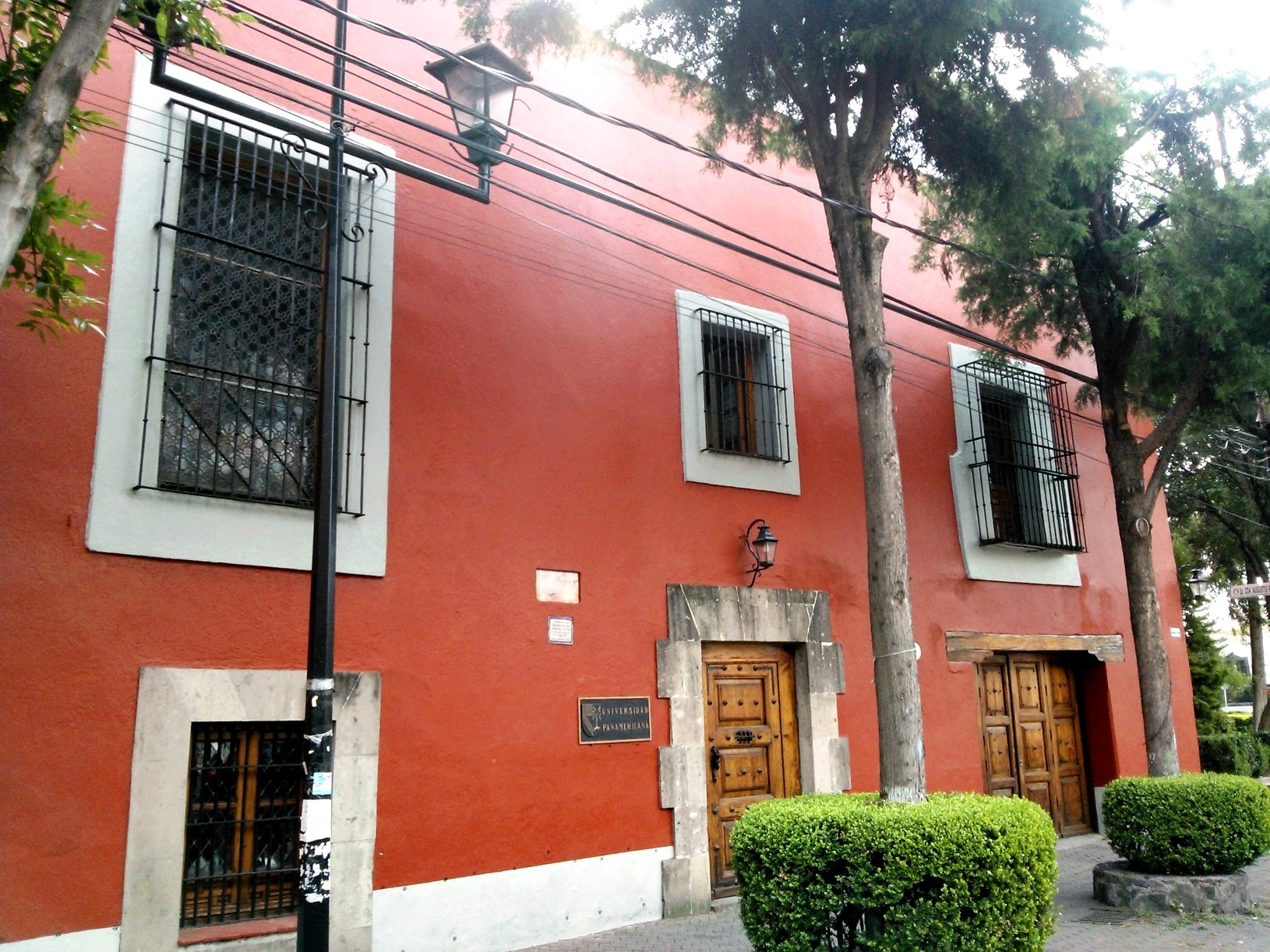
Façade of the Obraje de Mixcoac (textile factory)

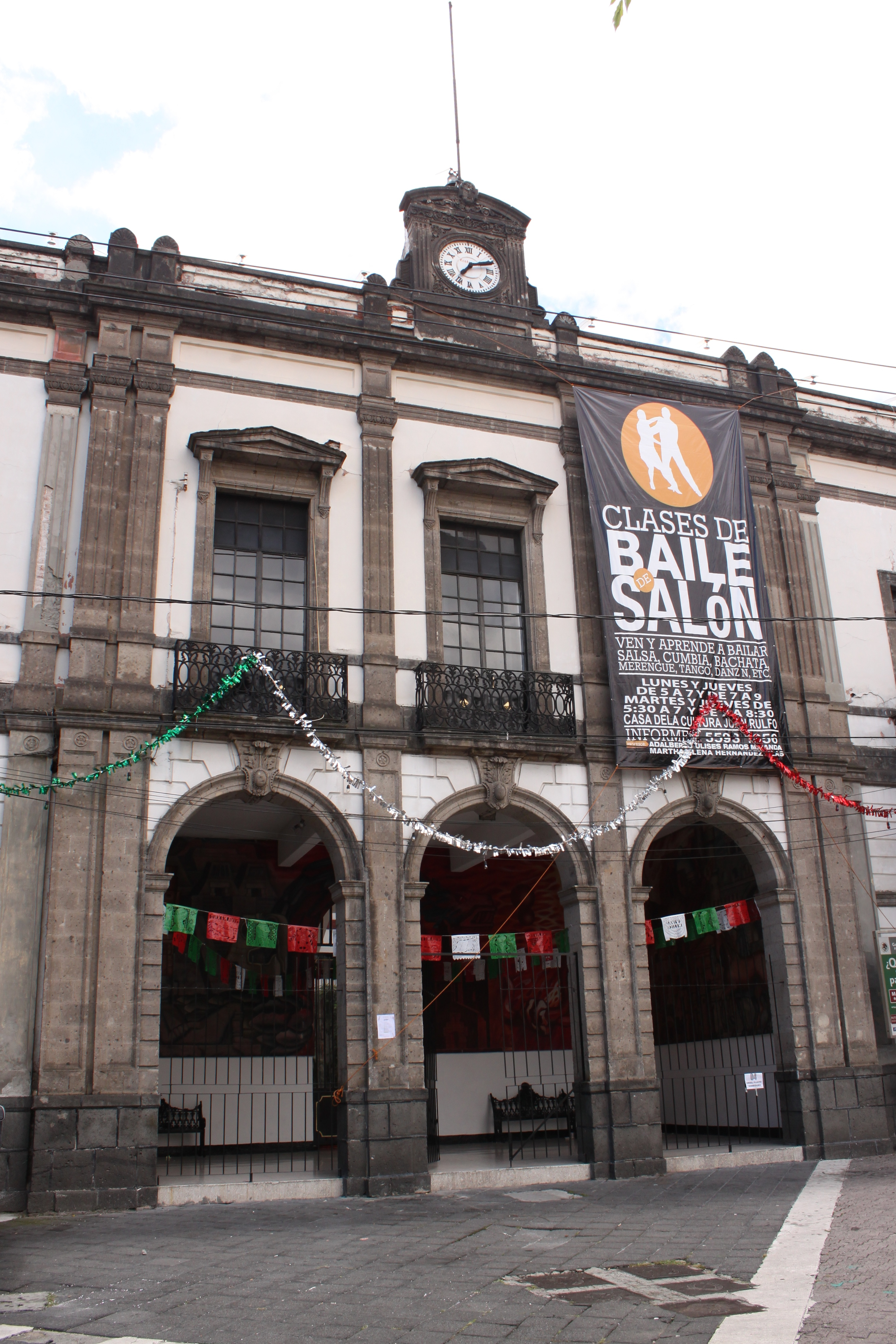
Centro Cultural Juan Rulfo, former Ayuntamiento (City Hall) of Mixcoac

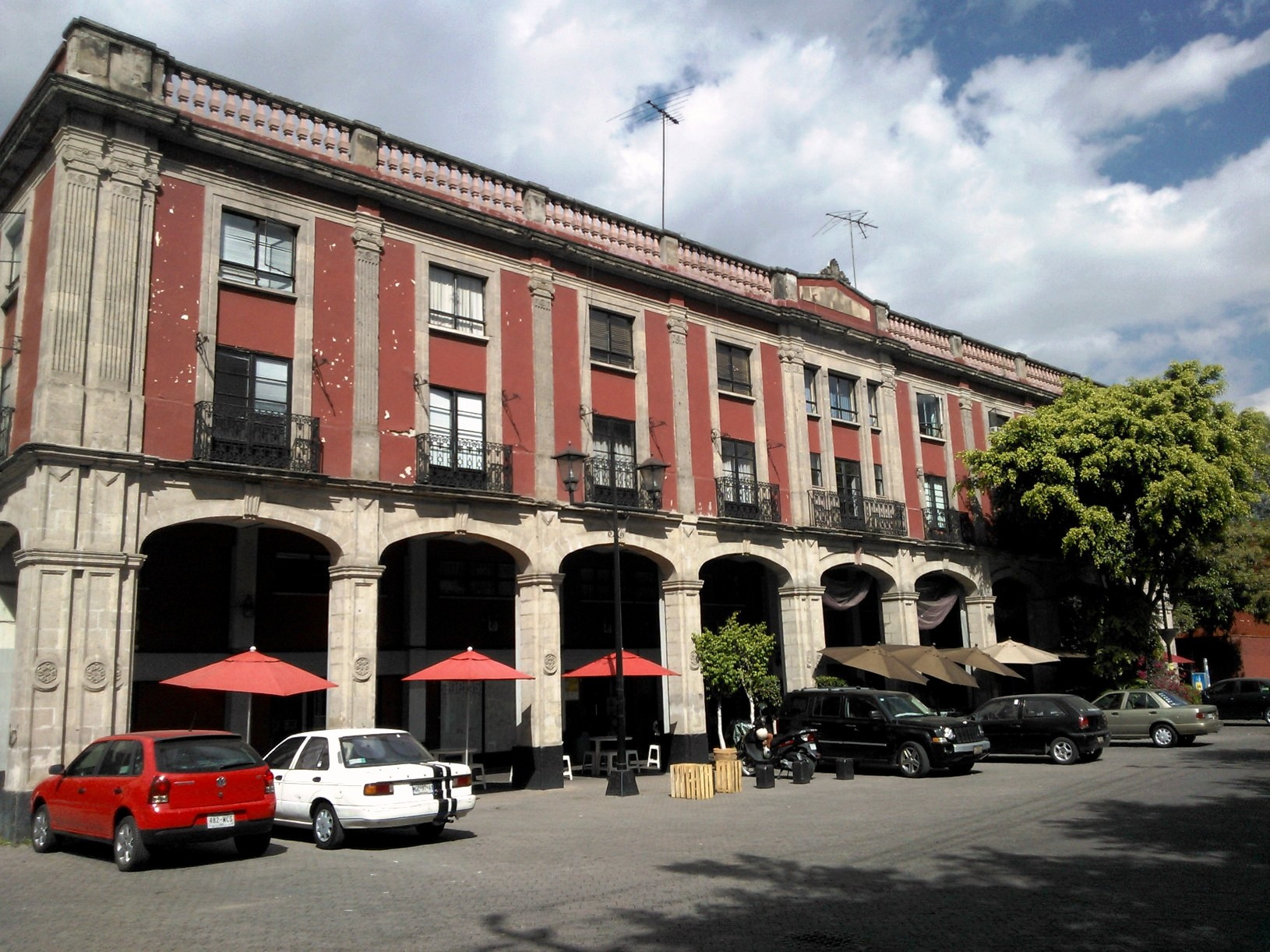
Portales de Mixcoac, former Banderas family house

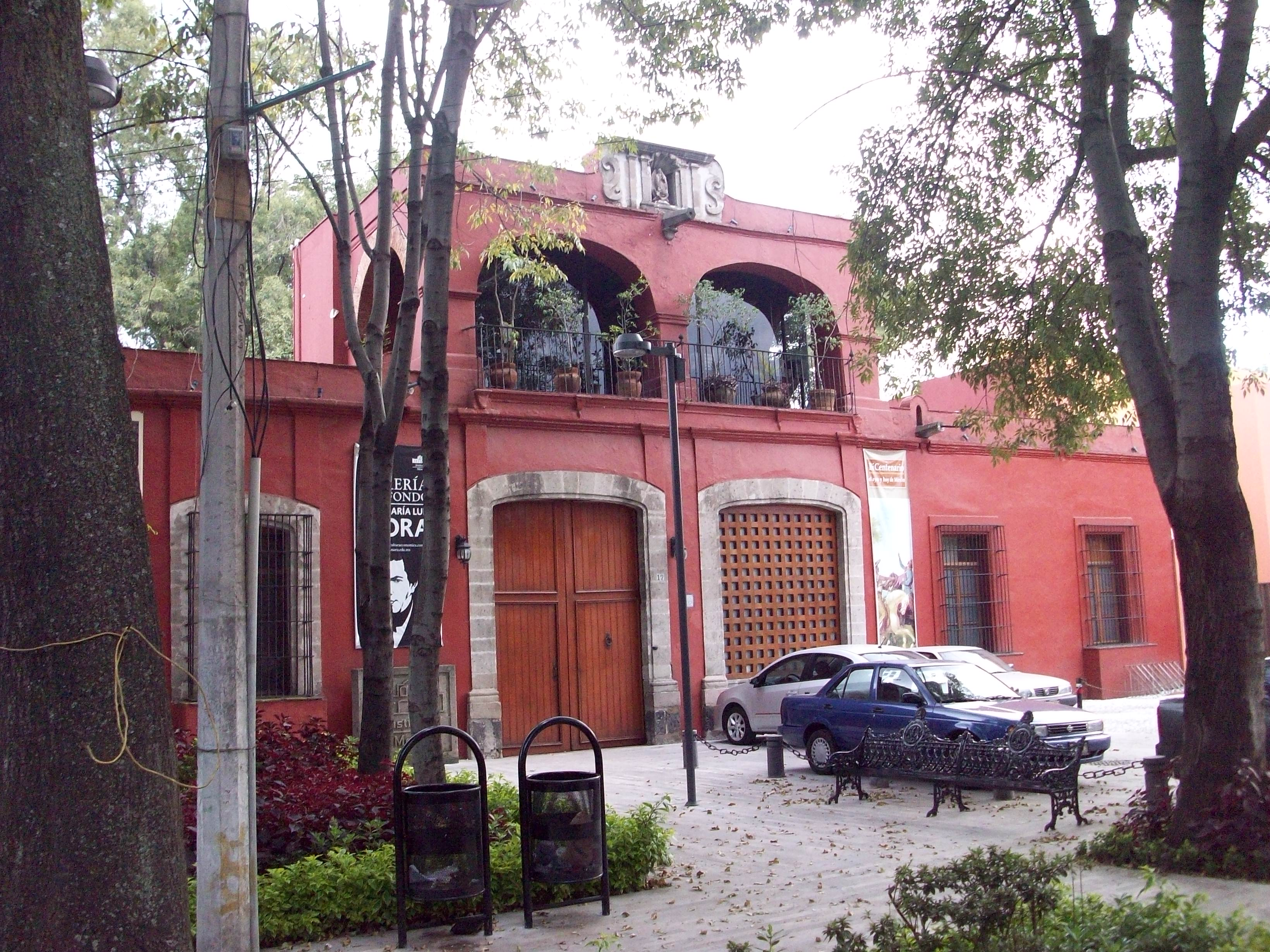
Instituto Mora, house of Valentín Gómez Farías

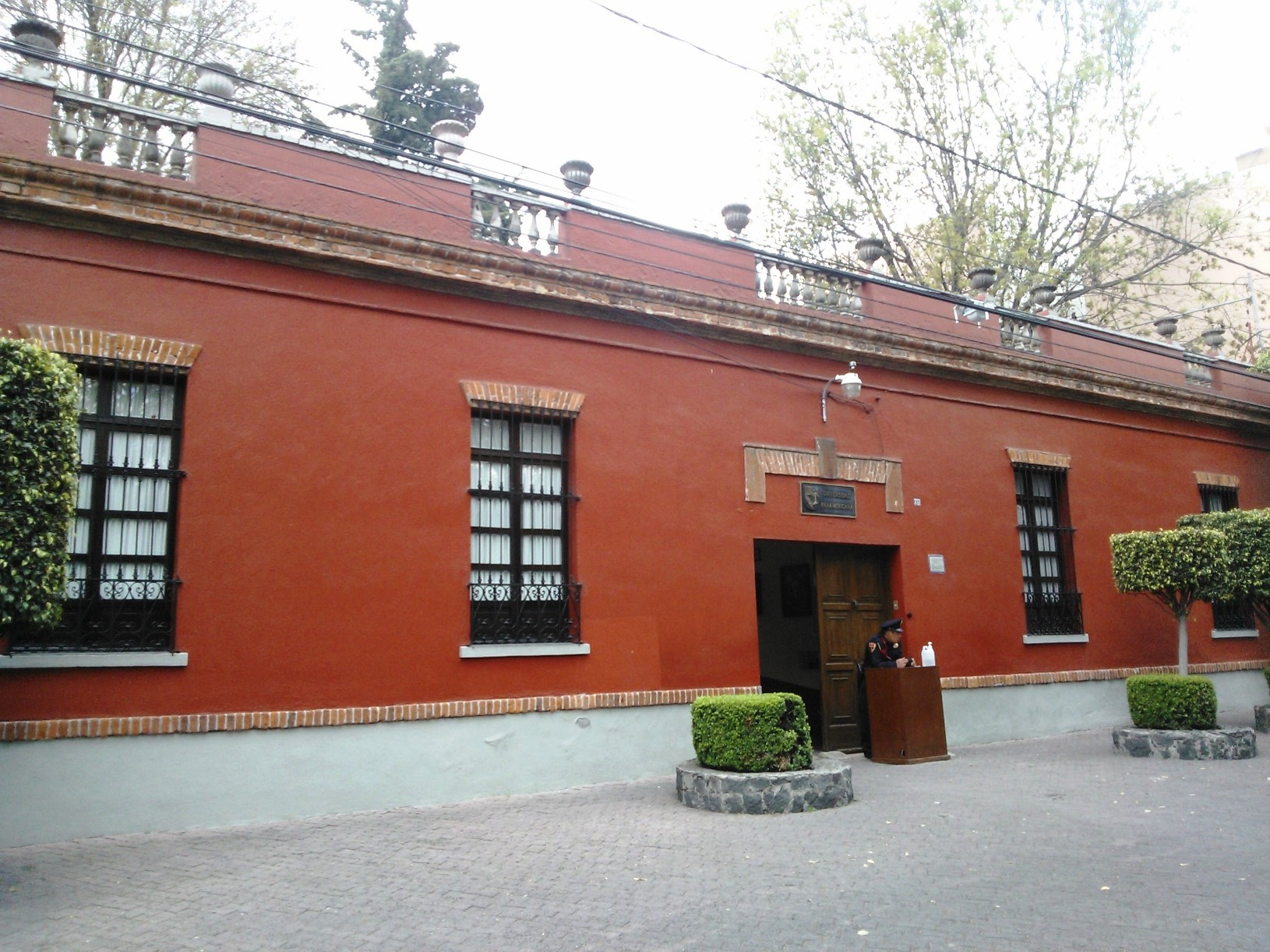
House of José Joaquín Fernández de Lizardi

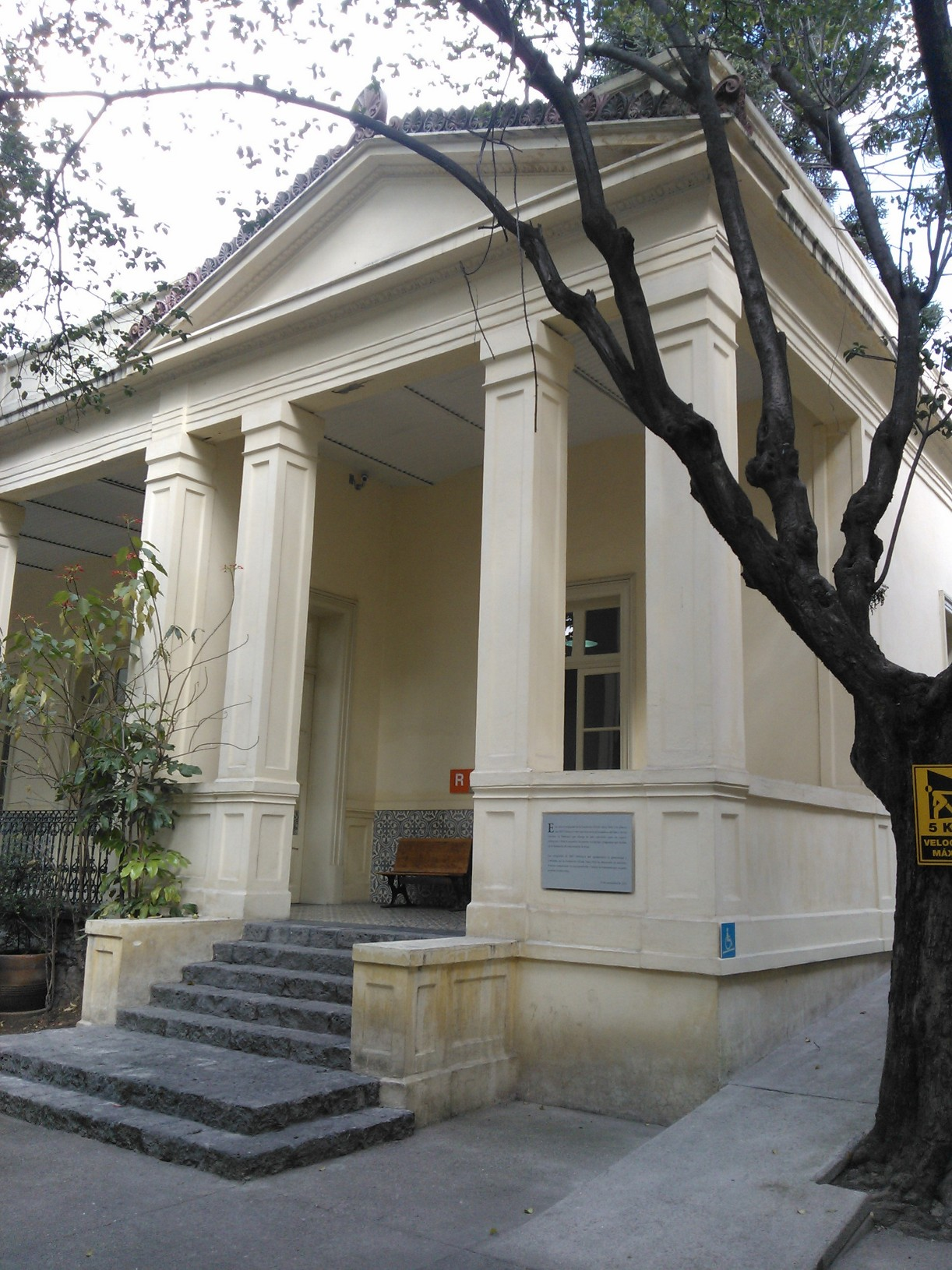
Casa del Portico, now the IBBY Library

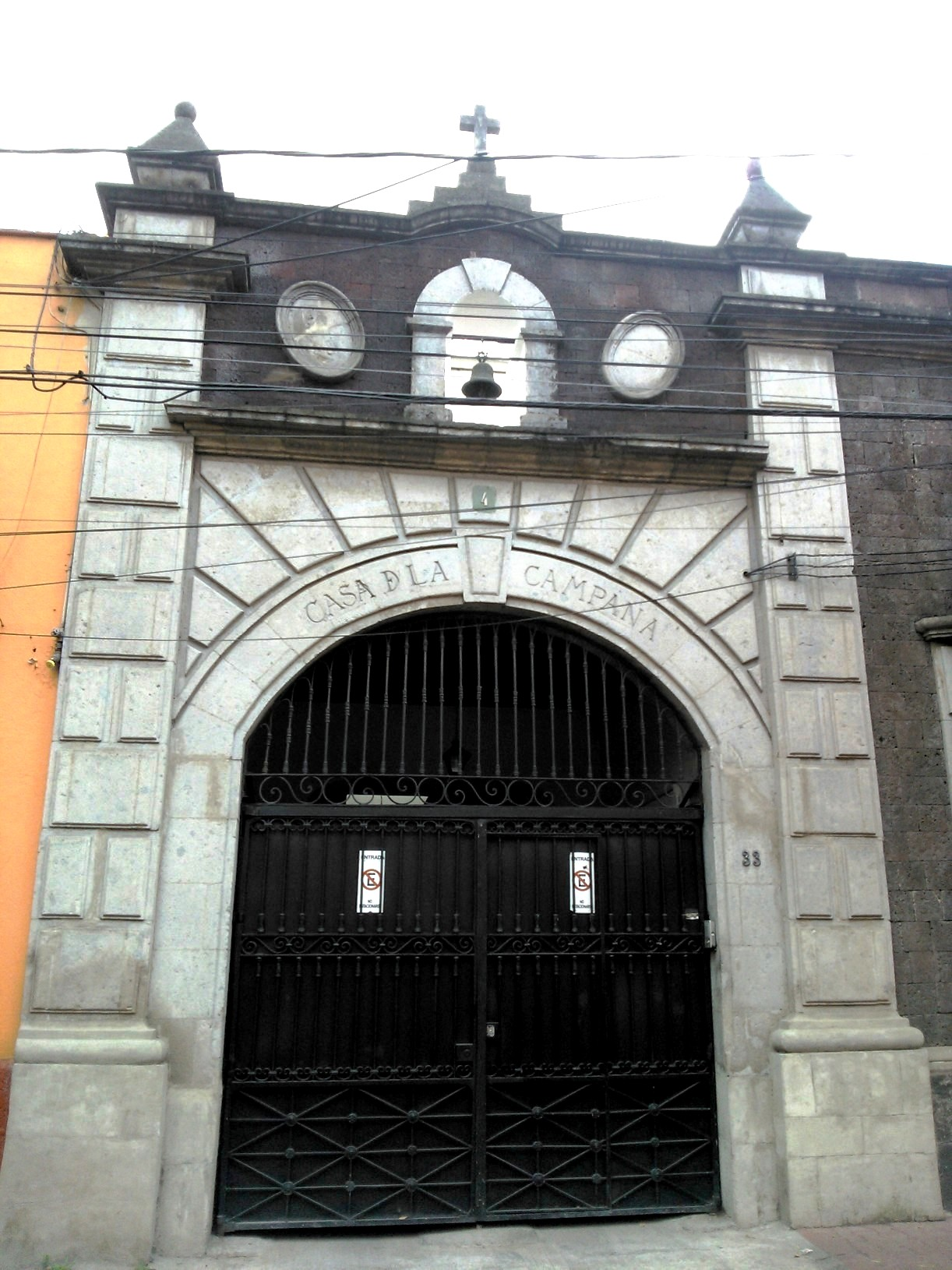
Casa de la Campana

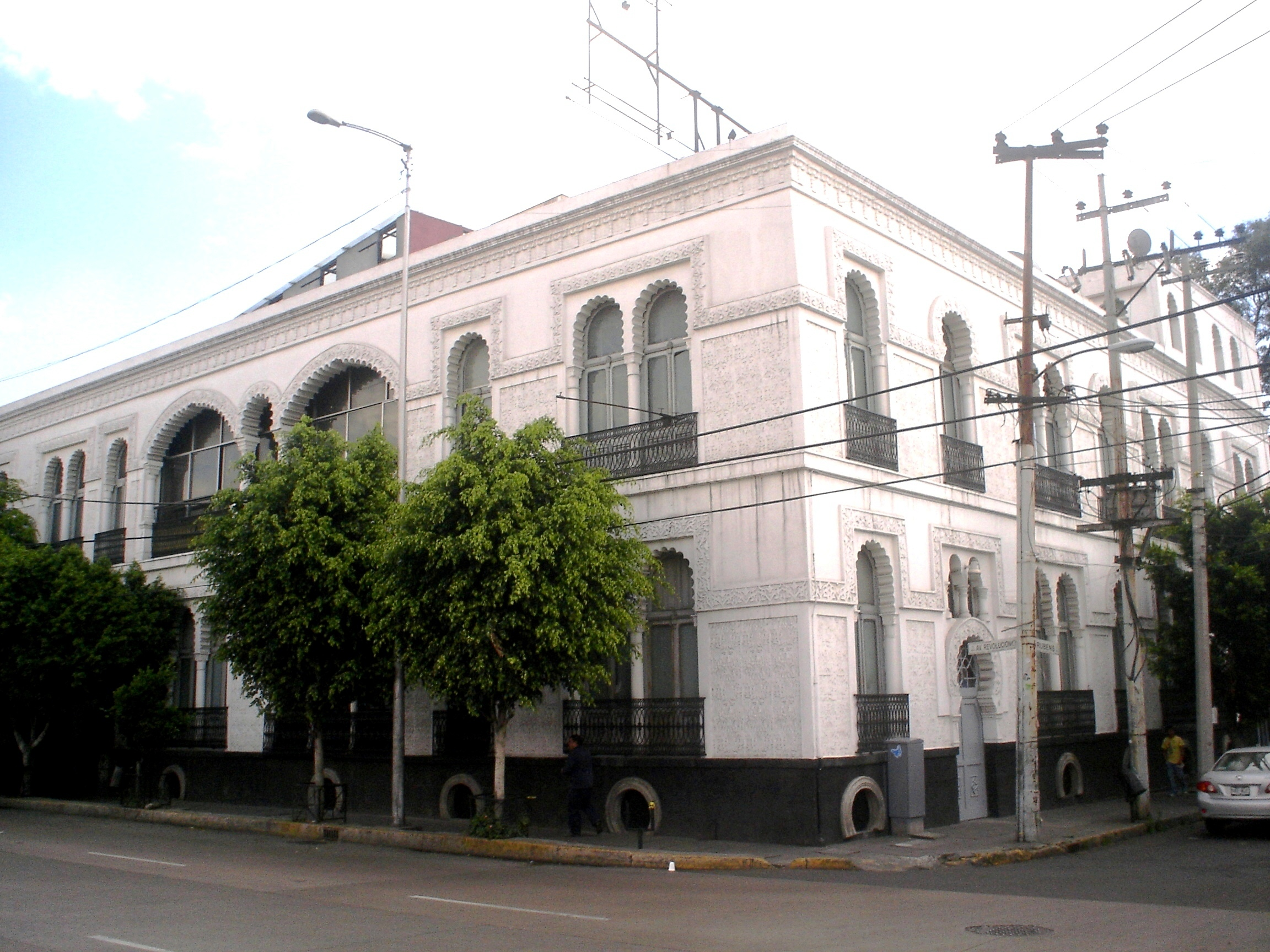
Casa Serralde

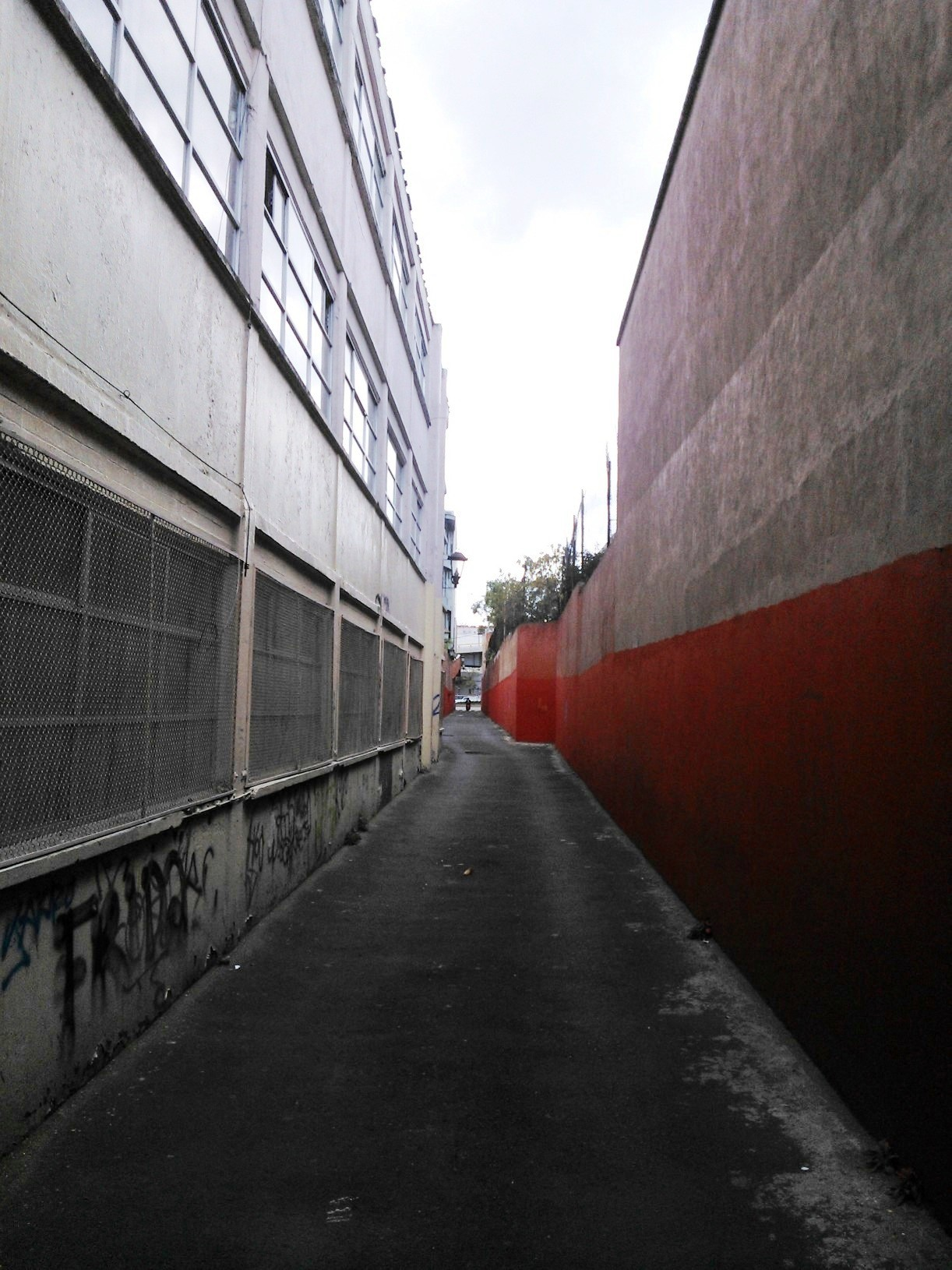
Callejón del diablo ("Devil's Alley")

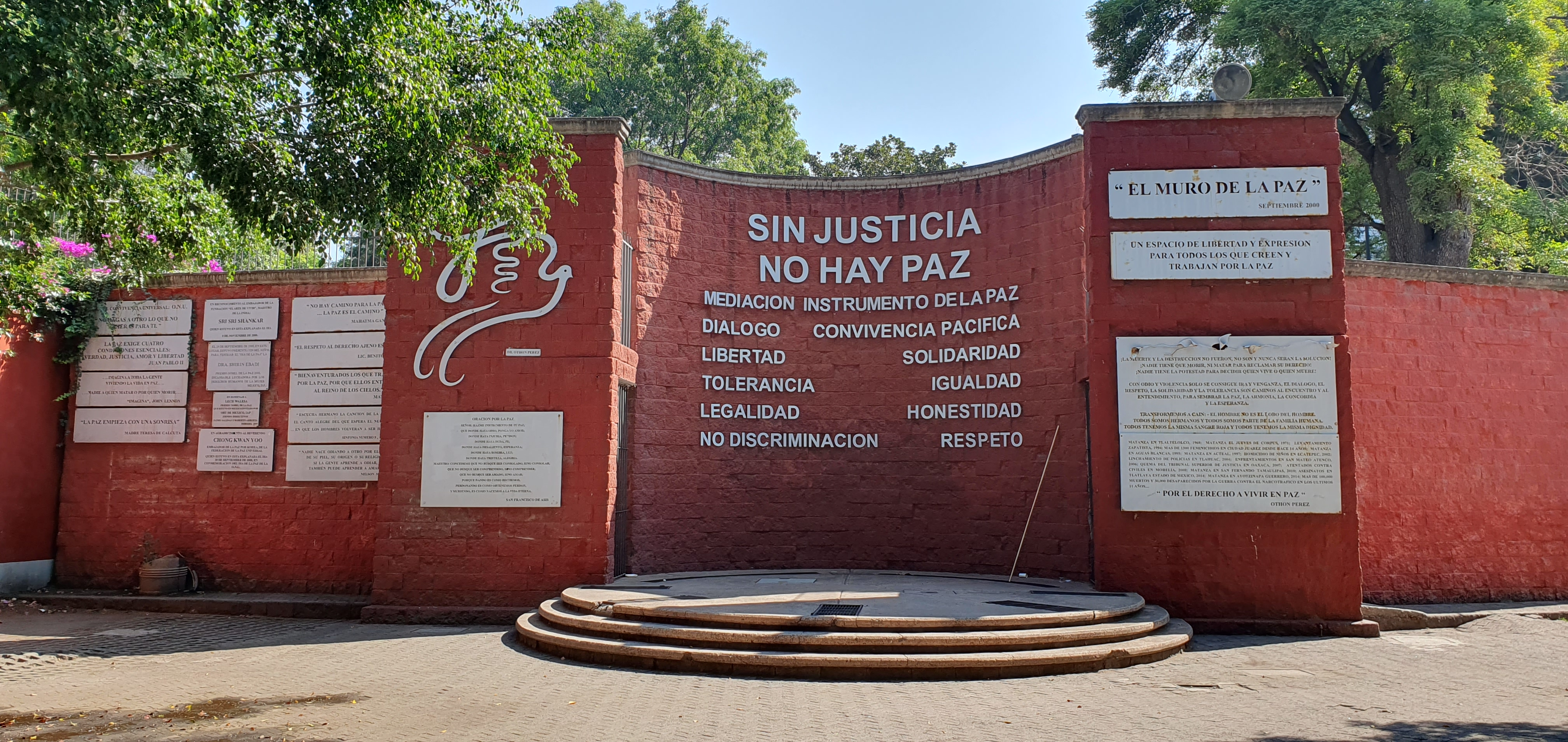
Muro de la Paz ("Peace Wall")

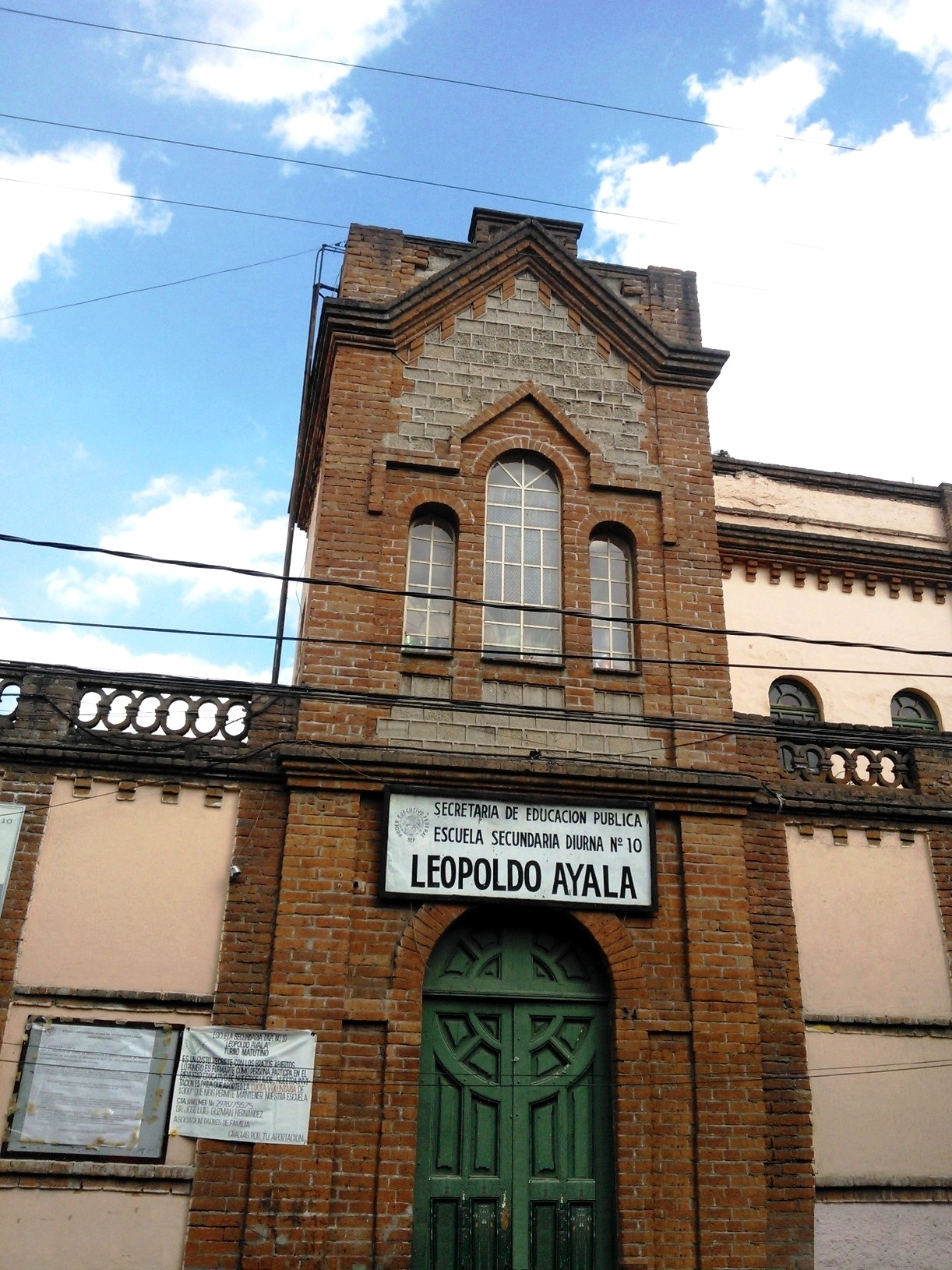
Leopoldo Ayala high school

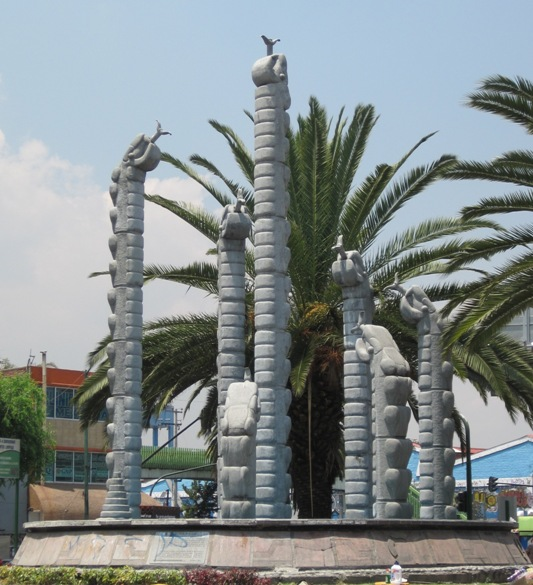
Fountain symbolizing Mixcoac's historic identity

== Sources ==
- "Mixcoac", Mexico Desconocido
- "Mixcoac, el Barrio Mágico de la Ciudad", Chilango, 2012-08-13
- Crónicas y relatos de México - Los tesoros de Mixcoac (30/01/2014)
