= Simón Bolívar University (Mexico) =

Coordinates: 19.3720°N 99.1854°W

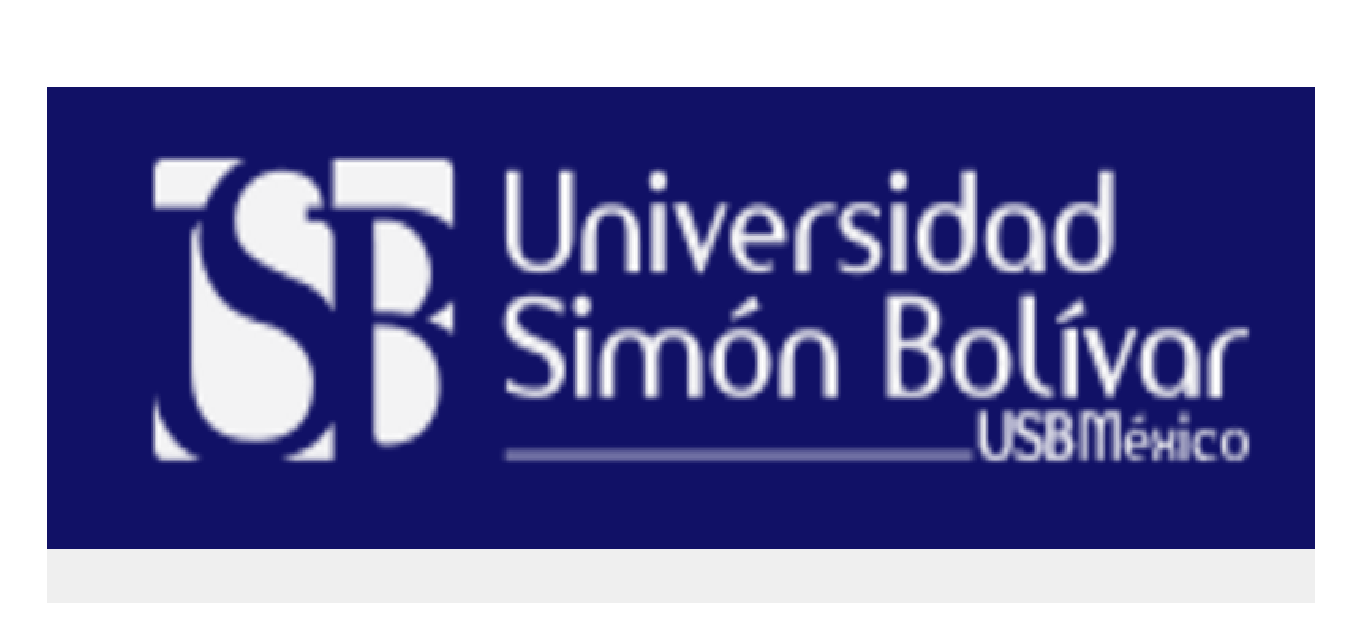

Simón Bolívar University (Spanish: Universidad Simón Bolívar or USBMéxico) is a private Roman Catholic university in Mixcoac, Benito Juárez, Mexico City. Currently, it teaches 15 bachelor's programmes, 8 master's degree programmes and one specialty. It is named after Venezuelan military and political leader Simón Bolívar.

== History ==
The university began in 1944 when the Franciscan Sisters of the Immaculate Conception started an education project beginning from the basic levels of learning; with the creation of the preschool and primary levels, the Colegio Simón Bolívar (Simón Bolívar College) was founded. In 1952, they opened the Escuela Normal de Educación Primaria (Normal School – that is, a teacher's college – of Primary Education), this being the first programme for professional training. In 1981, Simón Bolívar University as it is known today arose, conferring bachelor's degrees in graphic design and biology, thus becoming the only private university in the Mexico City metropolitan area to award the latter even now. Nowadays, Simón Bolívar University offers 25 bachelor's and master's programmes.

== Bachelor's degrees ==
- Accountacy
- Biology
- Biological and pharmaceutical Chemistry
- Biotechnology
- Business Information Technology
- Business Administration
- Clinical Biochemistry
- Communication and Multimedia
- Food Engineering
- International Trade and Customs Management
- Law
- Marketing and Commercial Relations
- Pedadogy
- Telecommunications Engineering
- Visual Communication Design

== Master's degrees ==
- Administrative Sciences
- Communication for Political and Social Action
- Computer Science and Technology Administration
- Environmental Science
- Multimedia Project Design
- Productivity and Quality Systems Administration
- University-level Teaching
- Visual Communication

=== Specialty ===
- Specialty in Web Design

== Campus ==
The main building, housing the rector's office along with some administrative offices, dates from the 18th century, and is one of the zone's protected residences.

=== Library ===
The university's library can be found in a big house that dates from colonial times in which, later, General José Joaquín de Herrera installed his provisional government in 1848, during the Mexican–American War, thus making the building into a national historic monument.
