= EMV (disambiguation) =

EMV is a payment method based on a technical standard.

EMV may also refer to:

- East Malvern railway station, Melbourne
- Enhanced motion vehicle, a ride vehicle developed by Walt Disney Imagineering
- Escuela Mexicana del Valle, the Mexican school
- Emergency Management Victoria, the Australian agency
- Ease of movement, an indicator used in technical analysis to relate an asset's price change to its volume
- Embilipitiya Maha Vidyalaya, a school in Sri Lanka which offers primary and secondary education

== See also ==
- Levante-EMV
