= Colonia Extremadura Insurgentes =

Extremadura Insurgentes
- Neighborhood of Mexico City
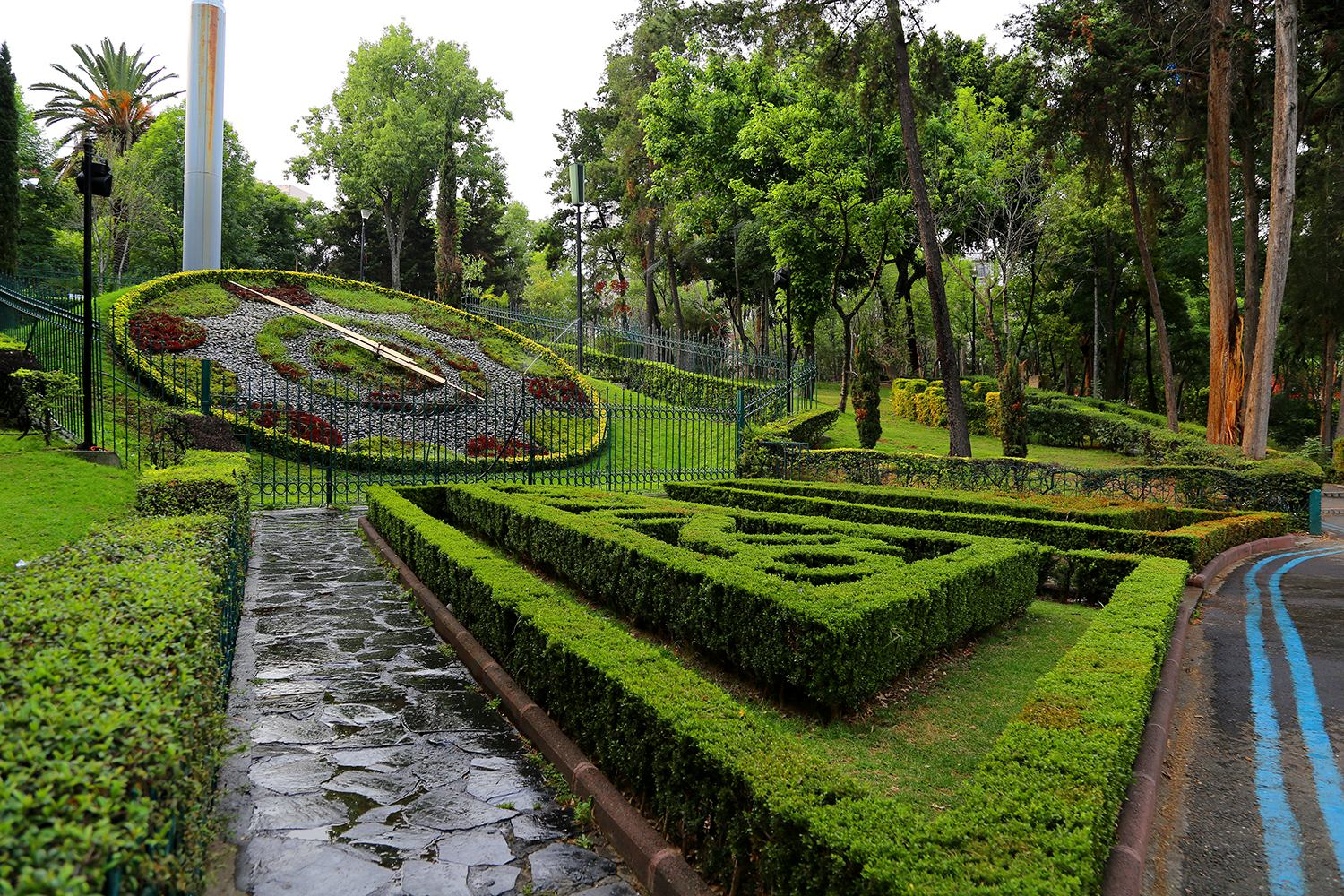
- Parque Hundido, landmark of Extremadura Insurgentes

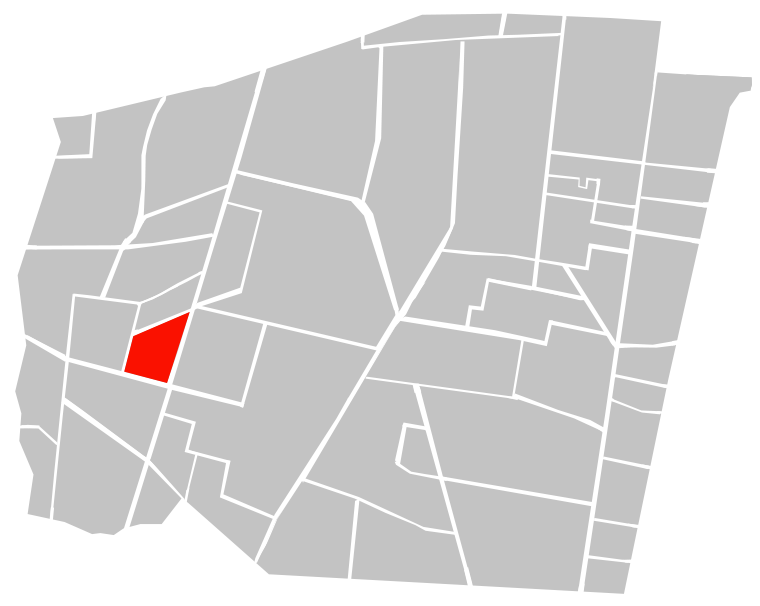
- Location of Extremadura Insurgentes (in red) within Benito Juárez borough
- Country: Mexico
- City: Mexico City
- Municipality: Benito Juárez

Area
  - Total: 0.24 km^{2} (0.093 sq mi)

Population (2022)
  - Total: 1,910
- Postal code: 03740

Colonia Extremadura Insurgentes, or simply Extremadura Insurgentes, is a neighborhood located in southwest Mexico City, famous for being home to Parque Hundido.

== Location ==
Colonia Extremadura Insurgentes is located in the Benito Juárez borough of Mexico City.

The neighborhood is bordered by:

- Parque Hundido on the north, across which is Colonia Noche Buena
- Augusto Rodin street on the west, across which is Colonia San Juan
- Empresa street on the south, across which is Colonia Insurgentes Mixcoac
- Avenida de los Insurgentes Sur, across which is Colonia Tlacoquemécatl

== Description ==
Extremadura Insurgentes is a mainly residential neighborhood, relatively calm, despite bordering crowded Avenida de los Insurgentes Sur. The colonia has some small commerces such as restaurants, beauty parlors and grocery stores.

One of Mexico City's most important public parks, Parque Hundido is located in the area.

== Transportation ==
=== Public transportation ===
The area is served by the Mexico City Metrobús and EcoBici bikeshare. Although not located inside the neighborhood limits, Insurgentes Sur metro station is within walking distance.

Metrobús stations

- Félix Cuevas.
