= Colonia Noche Buena =

Noche Buena
- Neighborhood of Mexico City
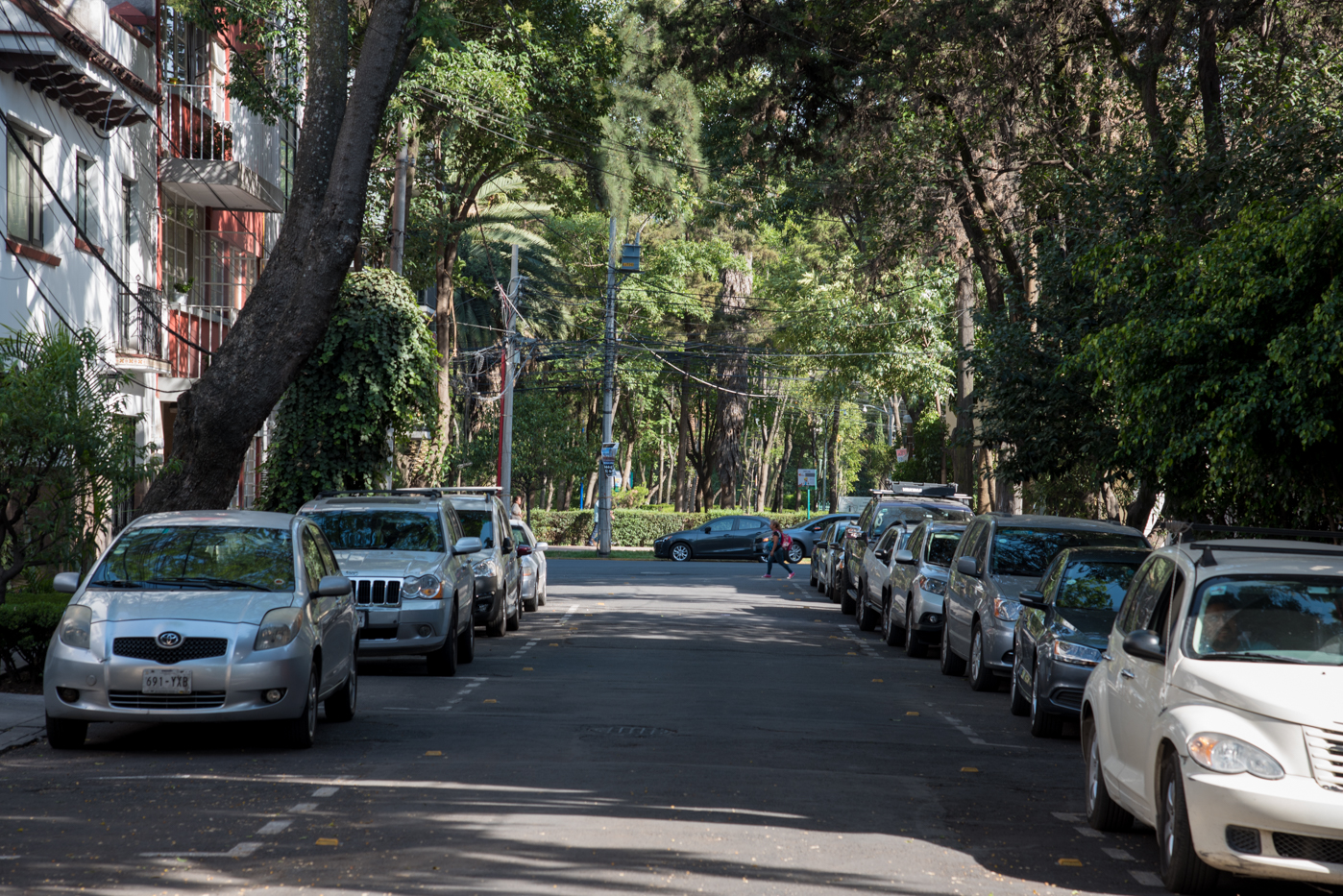
- Baltimore street with Parque Hundido in the background

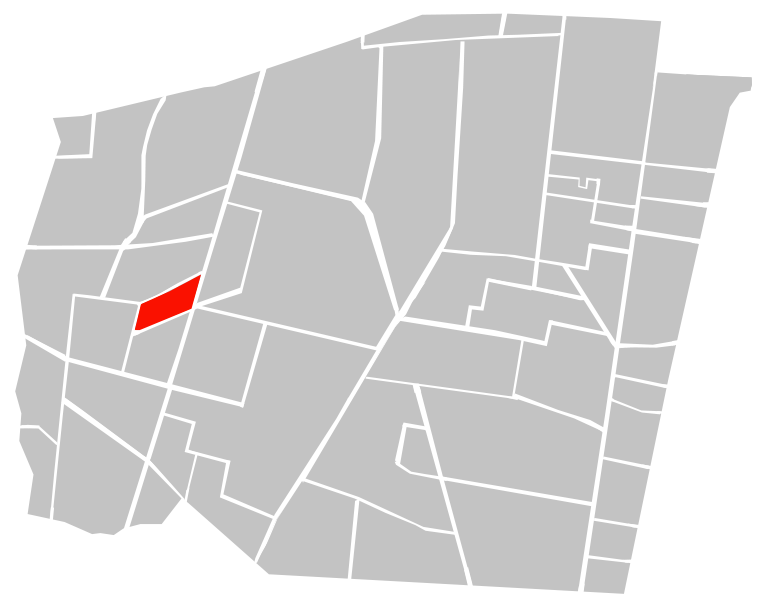
- Location of Colonia Noche Buena (in red) within Benito Juárez borough
- Country: Mexico
- City: Mexico City
- Municipality: Benito Juárez

Area
  - Total: 0.15 km^{2} (0.058 sq mi)

Population (2022)
  - Total: 2,257
- Postal code: 03720

Colonia Noche Buena is a neighborhood in Benito Juárez, Mexico City.

"Noche Buena" literally means "good night", but is also the Spanish name for Christmas Eve. The name comes from Compañía Ladrillera de la Noche Buena, a brickworks from the 19th century that was located in the lands that now belong to the Parque Hundido and the Colonia Noche Buena.

== Location ==
Colonia Noche Buena is located in the Benito Juárez municipality of Mexico City.

The neighborhood is bordered by:

- Eje 6 Sur Holbein on the north, across which is Ciudad de los Deportes
- Augusto Rodin street on the west, across which is Colonia San Juan
- Porfirio Díaz Avenue on the south, across which is Colonia Extremadura Insurgentes
- Avenida de los Insurgentes Sur on the east, across which is Colonia Insurgentes San Borja and Colonia del Valle Centro

== Description ==
Colonia Noche Buena is mainly a residential neighborhood consisting of apartment buildings and houses that date back to the 1950s, though some of this buildings have been demolished and replaced by modern apartment buildings. The neighborhood has, also, a few small cafés and restaurants.

Similarly to adjacent Ciudad de los Deportes and Colonia Nápoles, Noche Buena's street nomenclature corresponds to cities and states of the United States, such as Baltimore, Florida, Carolina and Cleveland, to name a few.

A house that belonged to Octavio Paz is located in the neighborhood. Mexico City's government has planned to transform it into a public library and cultural space.

== Transportation ==
=== Public transportation ===
The area is served by the Mexico City Metrobús Line 1 and EcoBici bikeshare.

Metrobús stations

- Parque Hundido
