= Colonia San Juan =

San Juan
- Neighborhood of Mexico City
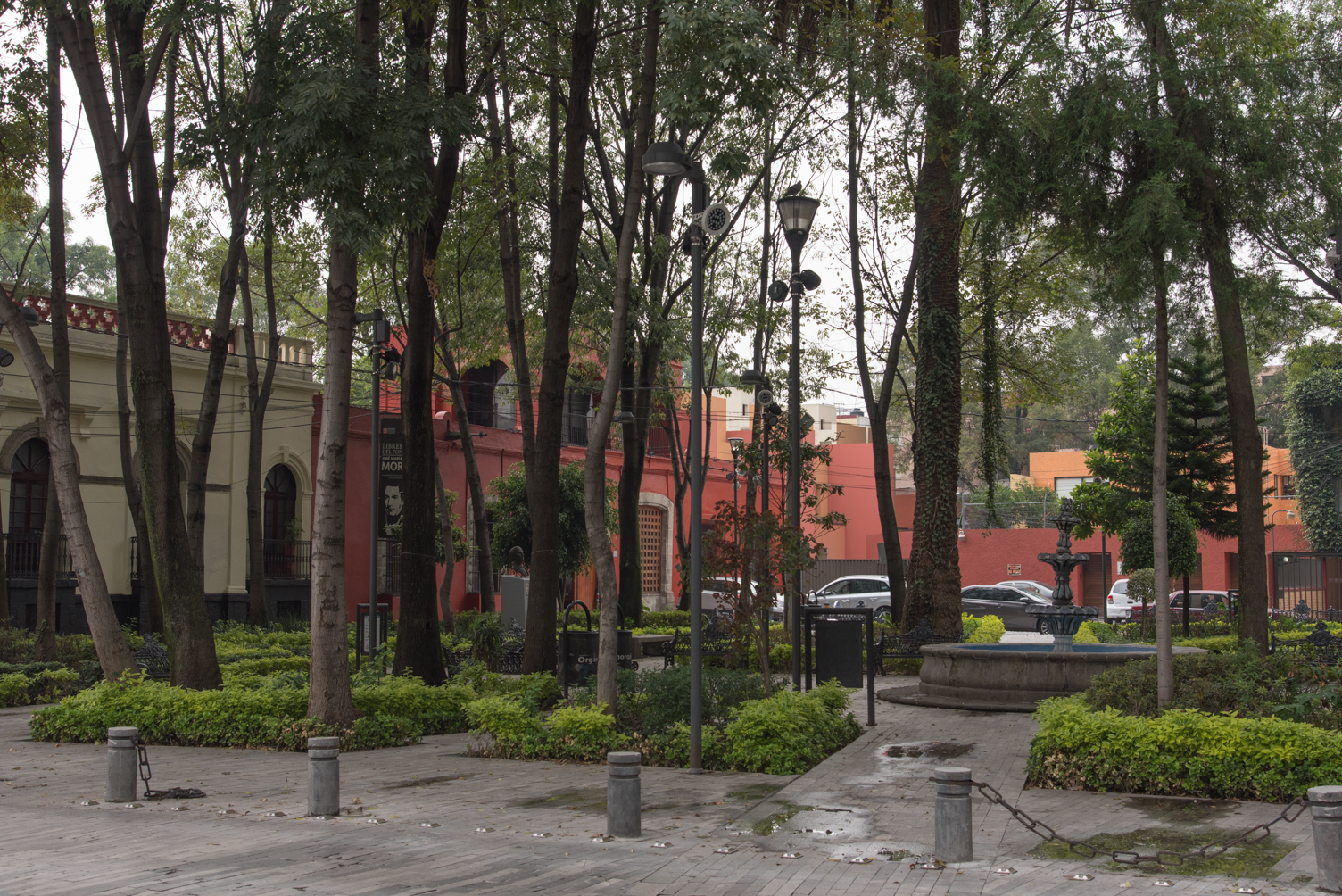
- Plaza Valentín Gómez Farías

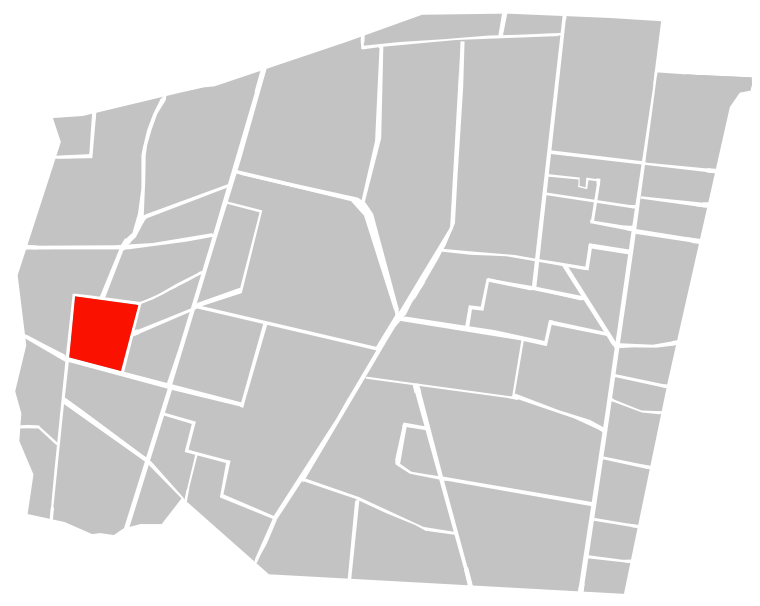
- Location of Colonia San Juan (in red) within Benito Juárez borough
- Country: Mexico
- City: Mexico City
- Municipality: Benito Juárez

Area
  - Total: 0.31 km^{2} (0.12 sq mi)

Population (2022)
  - Total: 3,637
- Postal code: 03730

Colonia San Juan, also known as San Juan Mixcoac, is a neighborhood in Benito Juárez, Mexico City.

== Location ==
Colonia San Juan is located in the Benito Juárez borough, in southern Mexico City.

The neighborhood is bordered by:

- Eje 6 Sur Holbein on the north, across which is Santa María Nonoalco and Ciudad de los Deportes
- Av. Revolución on the west, across which is Santa María Nonoalco
- Empresa street on the south, across which is Colonia Insurgentes Mixcoac
- Augusto Rodin street on the east, across which is Colonia Noche Buena and Colonia Extremadura Insurgentes

== Description ==
The neighborhood is mainly a residential zone, with some small shops and businesses such as convenience stores, tailor shops, restaurants and tortillerías.

The colonia has one public plaza, the Plaza Valentín Gómez Farías, that dates back to the 17th century. The former house of Mexican president Valentín Gómez Farías, where he was even buried some years after his death in 1858, is located on one of the sides of the plaza. The building now houses Instituto Mora, a public research school.

Colonia San Juan has one church, the Parroquia San Juan Evangelista y Nuestra Señora de Guadalupe (Church of Saint John the Evangelist and Our Lady of Guadalupe) a colonial building, dating back to the 17th century. The church has pieces of great artistic value, such as an oil painting of the Virgin of Guadalupe and a sculpture of John the Evangelist. The church is located in front of Plaza Valentín Gómez Farías.

Besides Valentín Gómez Farías, other notable historical residents include Mexican intellectual Ireneo Paz, grandfather of Mexican writer and Nobel laureate Octavio Paz, who lived in a 19th century house that is still in the neighborhood but is now used as a house of Dominican preachers.

== Education ==
Colonia San Juan is home to the Instituto de Investigaciones Doctor José María Luis Mora or simply Instituto Mora, a public research institution focusing on History, Sociology and Regional Studies. The institute is located in the building that was the house of Valentín Gómez Farías, President of Mexico for five short periods in the 1830s and 1840s.

== Transportation ==
=== Public transportation ===
The area is served by Mexico City Metro and EcoBici bikeshare.

Metro stations

- Mixcoac
