= Tomás Alva Edison School =

Tomás Alva Edison School Spanish: Escuela Tomás Alva Edison

Information
- Established: 1983; 42 years ago
- Grades: Pre-Kindergarten - Grade 12
- Enrollment: 1991 (2015-2016)

Tomás Alva Edison School (TAE; Spanish: Escuela Tomás Alva Edison) is a private school in Colonia Del Valle, Benito Juárez, Mexico City. Serving grades PreK-12, it occupies four campuses, with one each for preschool, elementary school, middle school, and senior high school. Established in 1983, it originally had 110 students. As of the 2015–2016 school year it had 1,991 students.
