= Plaza de Toros México =

Building in Mexico City, Mexico

Plaza México
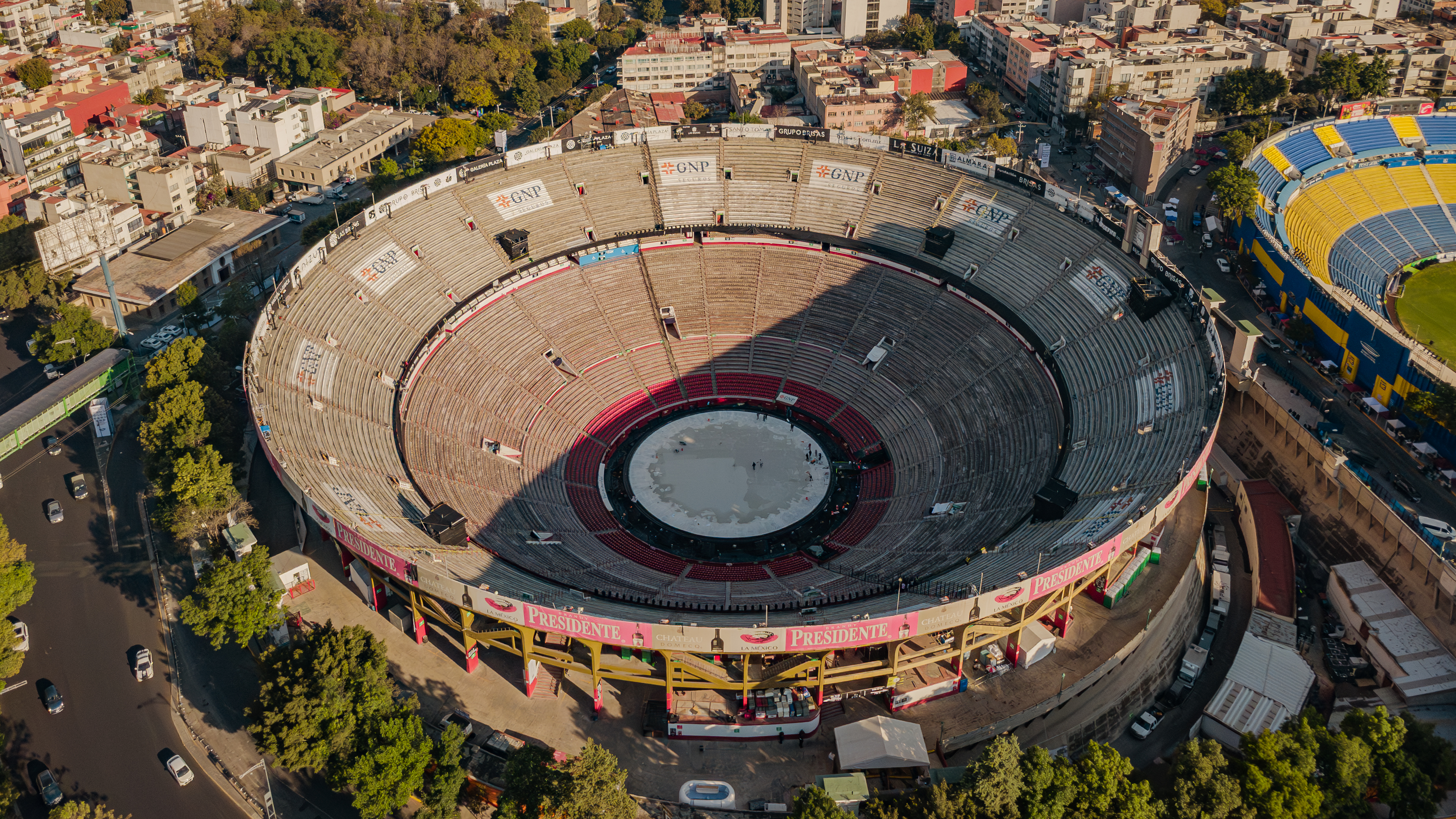
- Plaza México in 2026
- Interactive map of the Plaza México area

General information
- Type: Bullring
- Architectural style: Brutalist architecture
- Location: Calle Augusto Rodín 241; Ciudad de los Deportes, Benito Juárez; 03710, Mexico City, Mexico
- Coordinates: 19°23′0.20″N 99°10′41.61″W
- Current tenants: Empresa de la Plaza México
- Construction started: April 28, 1944; 82 years ago
- Inaugurated: February 5, 1946; 80 years ago

Design and construction
- Architect: Modesto C. Rolland

Other information
- Seating capacity: 41,262
- Public transit: Ciudad de los Deportes bus stop; San Antonio metro station

The Plaza de toros México, situated in Mexico City, is the world's largest bullring. The 41,262-seat facility is usually dedicated to bullfighting, but many boxing matches have been held there as well, including Julio César Chávez's third and final bout with Frankie Randall on May 22, 2004. The Plaza México replaced the former Toreo de la Condesa bullring in the Condesa neighborhood that was overwhelmed by the rapid growth of population in the capital. It opened on 5 February 1946 and annually since then, that date marks the date of the Corrida de Aniversario. This building was built beside the football stadium Estadio Ciudad de los Deportes (formerly Estadio Azul).
