= Ciudad de los Deportes =

- Neighborhood of Mexico City
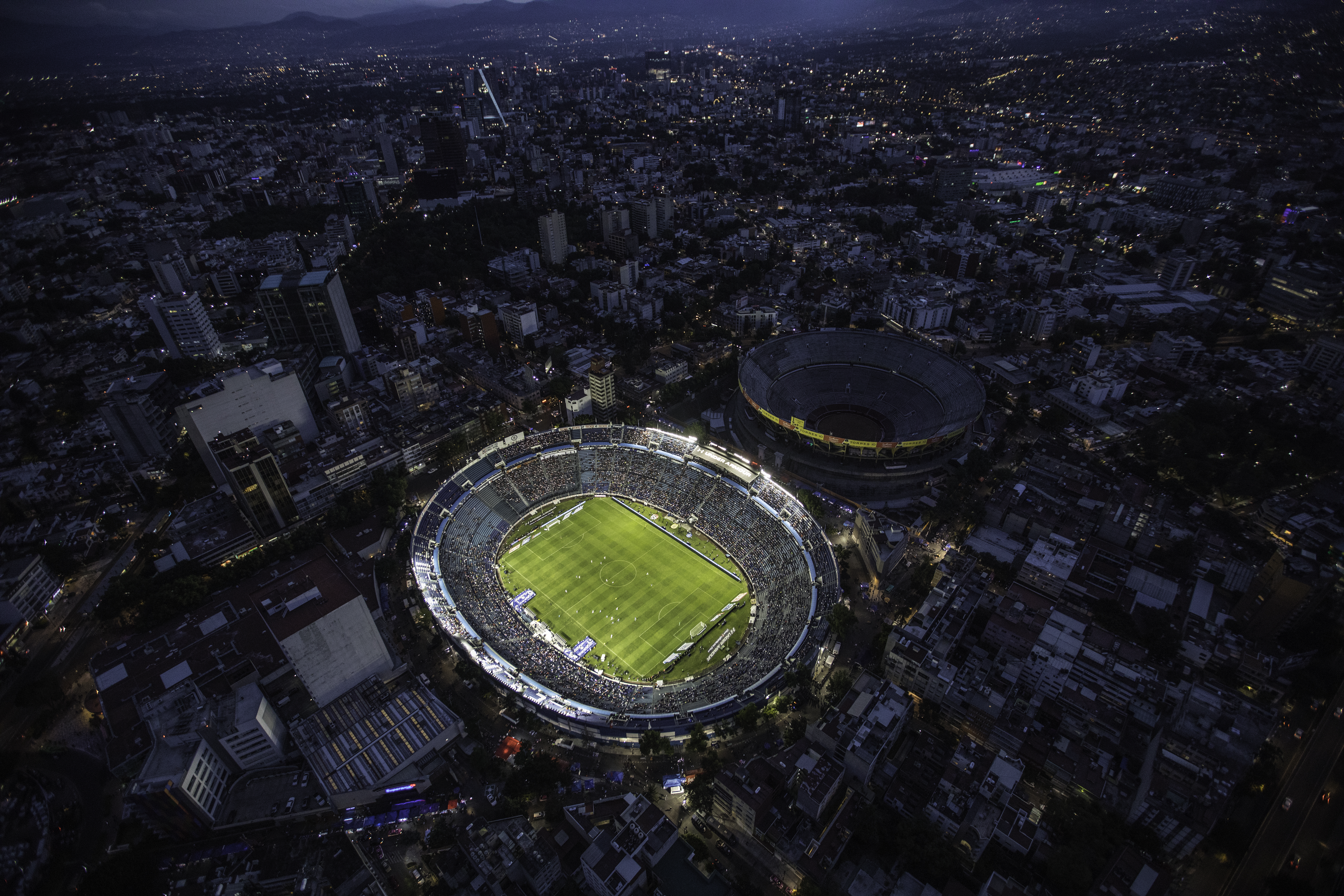
- Estadio Ciudad de los Deportes (left) and Plaza México (right)

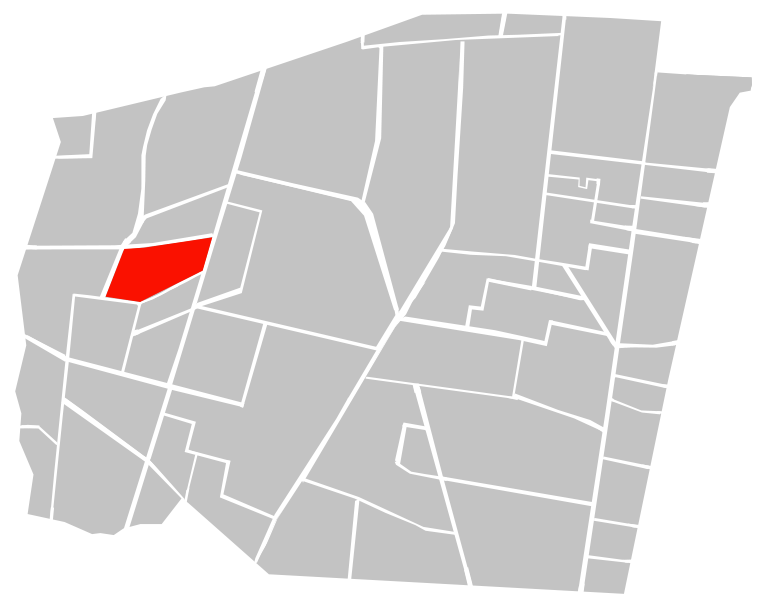
- Location of Ciudad de los Deportes (in red) within Benito Juárez borough
- Country: Mexico
- City: Mexico City
- Borough: Benito Juárez

Area
  - Total: 0.421 km^{2} (0.163 sq mi)

Population (2015)
  - Total: 4,100
- Postal code: 03710

Ciudad de los Deportes (literally: Sports City) is a neighborhood in Benito Juárez, Mexico City.

The neighborhood was initially planned to have several sports facilities including tennis courts, swimming pools, football fields and gymnasiums (hence the name) as well as a residential and commercial zone. Nevertheless, only two of the planned facilities were built: a bullring, the Plaza México and the Estadio Ciudad de los Deportes.

== Location ==
Ciudad de los Deportes is located in the Benito Juárez borough of Mexico City.

The neighborhood is bordered by:

- Eje 5 Sur San Antonio on the north, across which is Colonia Ampliación Nápoles
- Avenida Patriotismo on the west, across which is Santa María Nonoalco
- Eje 6 Sur Holbein on the south, across which is Colonia Noche Buena and Colonia San Juan
- Avenida de los Insurgentes Sur on the east, across which is Colonia Insurgentes San Borja

== Description ==
Ciudad de los Deportes has two of the most important sports facilities in Mexico City: Plaza de Toros México, the world largest bullring, and Estadio Azul former home to the football club Cruz Azul. The stadium, though, was set to be demolished in July 2018; a shopping center is planned to be built at the place.

The neighborhood is mainly residential, but it also has some restaurants, cafés and shops, including a large department store.

Similarly to adjacent Colonia Noche Buena and Colonia Nápoles, Ciudad de los Deportes' street nomenclature on the east side of the neighborhood corresponds to cities and states of the United States, such as Indiana, Atlanta and Carolina. On the west side, the nomenclature corresponds to painters, such as Tiepolo and Tintoretto.

== History ==
Ciudad de los Deportes' development started in the 1940s, projected as an area with several sports facilities and a residential and commercial zone in the lands of the former San Carlos ranch and La Guadalupana brickworks. The project, led by Neguib Simón Jalife, broke ground in 1944.

Nevertheless, due to economic problems, only the two major buildings were completed: the Plaza México and Estadio Ciudad de los Deportes, both inaugurated in 1946.

In recent years these two sports venues have hosted several important events. Estadio Ciudad de los Deportes was the home stadium of Cruz Azul, one of the most popular football clubs in Mexico, until its departure in 2018. The stadium currently houses another professional football team, Atlante, since 2020. Estadio Ciudad de los Deportes is also the venue for the Tazón México, the final game of the LFA, the top American football league in Mexico.

Plaza México hosts the annual bullfighting season, usually from November to March. In 2018, the Plaza hosted an exhibition tennis match between Roger Federer and Alexander Zverev in front of 42,517 spectators, breaking a world record for the most spectators in a tennis game.

== Transportation ==
=== Public transportation ===
The area is served by the Mexico City Metrobús and EcoBici bikeshare. While it is not located in the neighborhood, San Antonio metro station is within walking distance.

Metrobús stations

- Ciudad de los Deportes
- Colonia del Valle
