= Estadio Ciudad de los Deportes =

Sports stadium in Ciudad de los Deportes, Mexico City

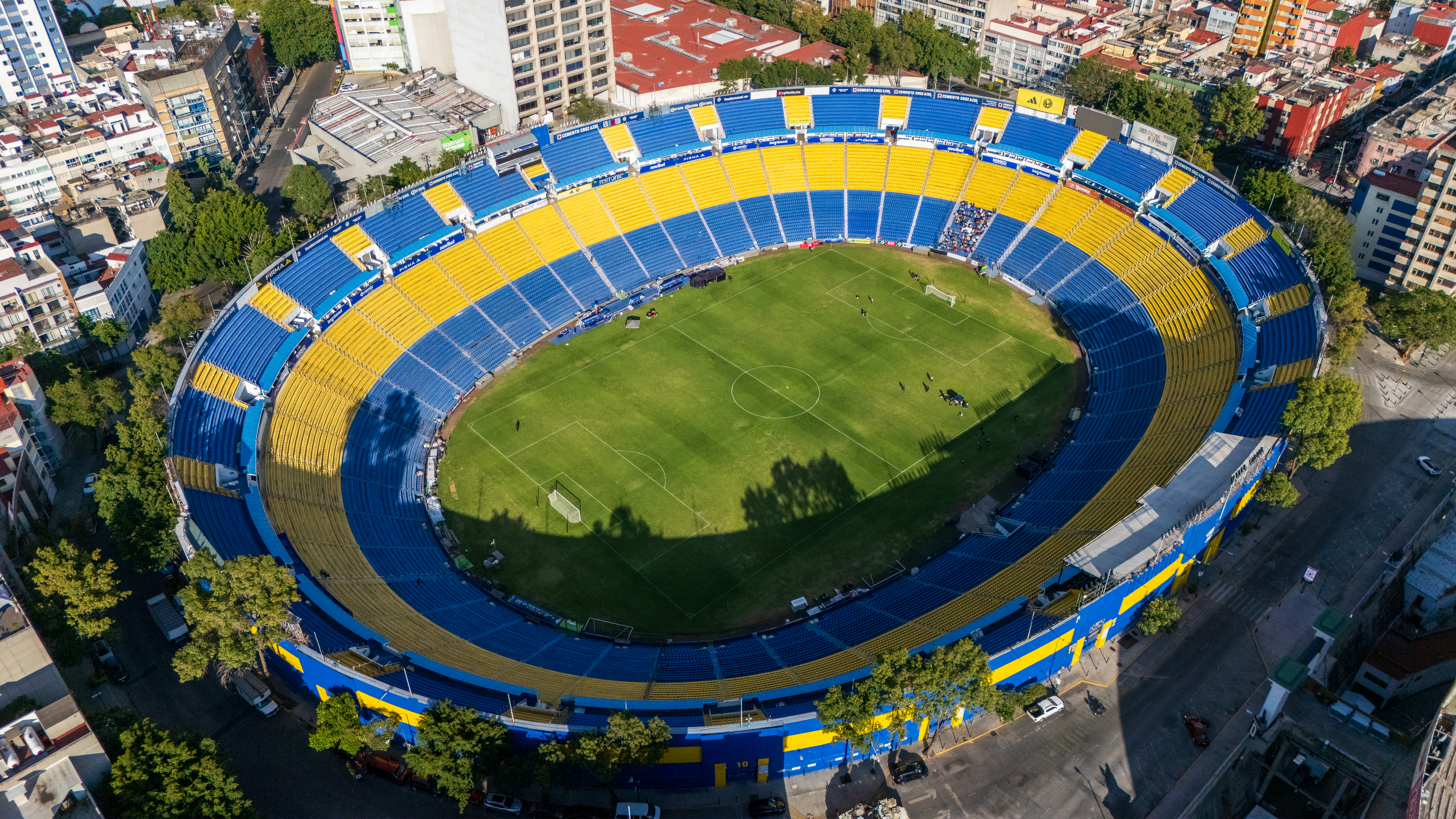
- Aerial view of the Ciudad de los Deportes Stadium.
- Interactive map of Estadio Ciudad de los Deportes
- Full name: Estadio Ciudad de los Deportes
- Former names: Estadio Olímpico Ciudad de los Deportes (1947–1983); Estadio Azulgrana (1983–1996); Estadio Azul (1996–2018)
- Location: Calle Indiana 255 Mexico City, Mexico C.P. 03810
- Coordinates: 19°23′0″N 99°10′42″W
- Owner: OCESA
- Capacity: 34,253
- Executive suites: 92 boxes
- Field size: 108 x 68 m
- Public transit: Ciudad de los Deportes bus stop; San Antonio metro station

Construction
- Opened: 6 October 1946
- Renovated: 1996, 2004, 2010

Tenants
- Club América (1947–1955, 2024–2026); Atlante (1947–1955, 1983–1989, 1991–1996, 2000–2002, 2020–2024); Necaxa (1950–1955); UNAM (1966–1969); Cruz Azul (1996–2018, 2024); Tazón México (2018–present)

Estadio Ciudad de los Deportes (English: Sports City Stadium) is a 34,253-seat multi-purpose stadium located in Ciudad de los Deportes, Mexico City. The facility is used for association football matches and for American football as well. The Tazón México has been played at the stadium. It is the current home stadium of football club Club América.

In summer 2016, Mexico City authorities announced plans to demolish the stadium would begin at the end of the 2017–2018 Liga MX season. However, in July 2018, the demolition project was put on hold. In the 2023–24 Liga MX season, Cruz Azul returned to the stadium.

Both times Mexico hosted the World Cup, Estadio Azul did not host matches mainly due to the age of the structure, bad parking facilities, and complex traffic patterns. A peculiarity of this stadium is that it is built as a pit with the playing field below street level. Just beside the stadium is the Plaza México, the world's largest bullring.

On 2 November 2024, local authorities closed the stadium indefinitely due to a lack of required safety certifications and issues with the stadium's infrastructure. The closure caused schedule disruptions for Club América, Atlante, and Cruz Azul. The stadium reopened on 7 November with new regulations such as an increase in security personnel at both the Estadio Ciudad de los Deportes and the Plaza de Toros, promotion of public transport to reach the venues, and the prohibition of holding two events on the same day. Atlante announced they would move to Estadio Agustín "Coruco" Díaz in Zacatepec, Morelos. On 8 January 2025 Cruz Azul announced its relocation to the Estadio Olímpico Universitario located in Ciudad Universitaria, Mexico City.

== Gallery ==
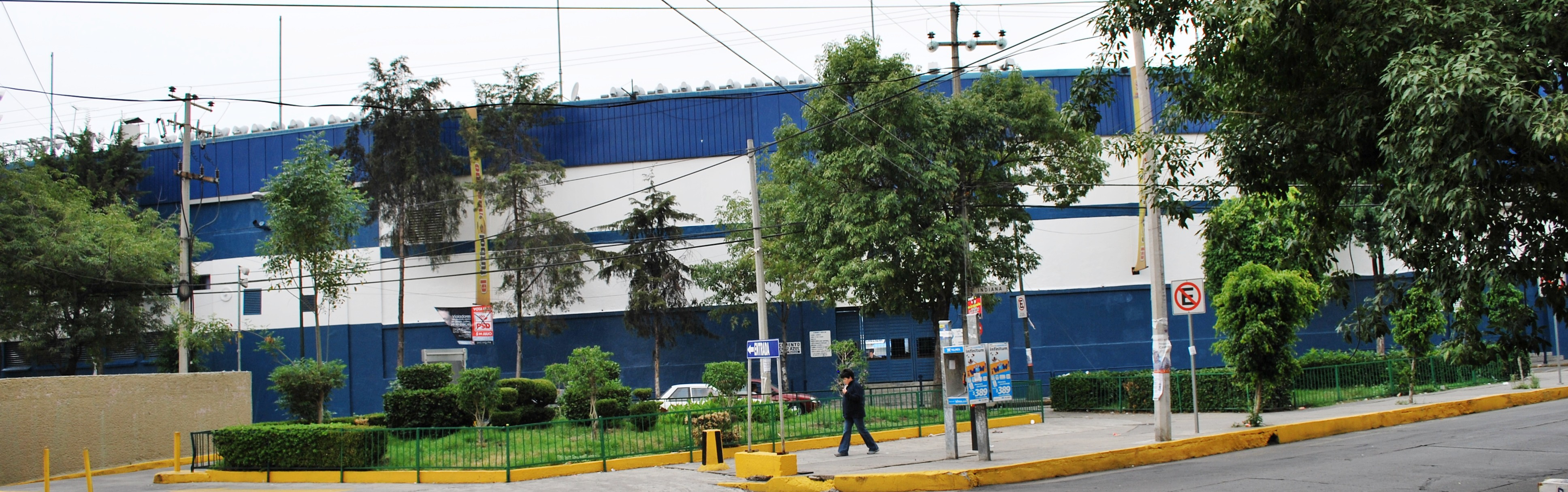
Exterior from a side street

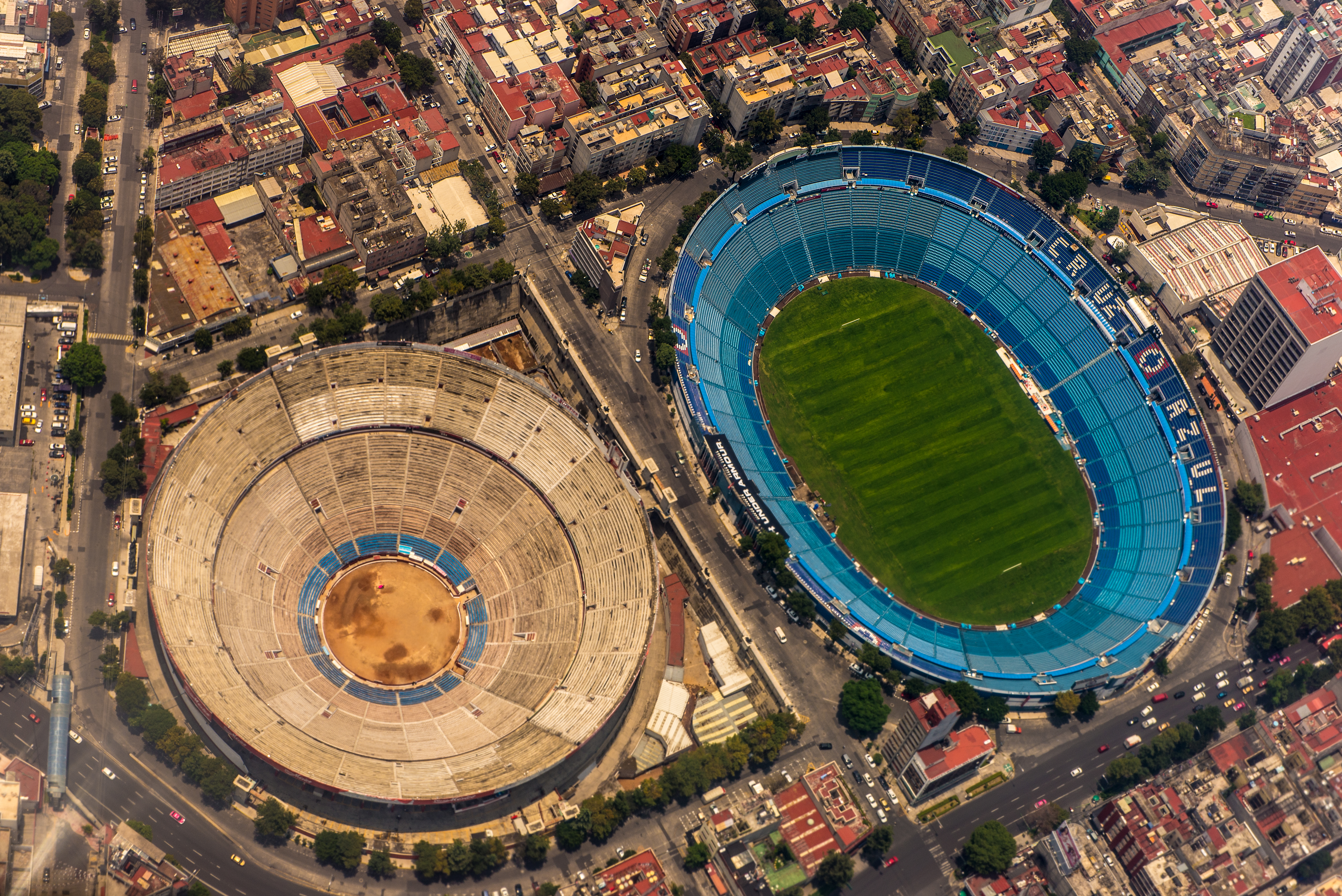
Stadium (right) from the air

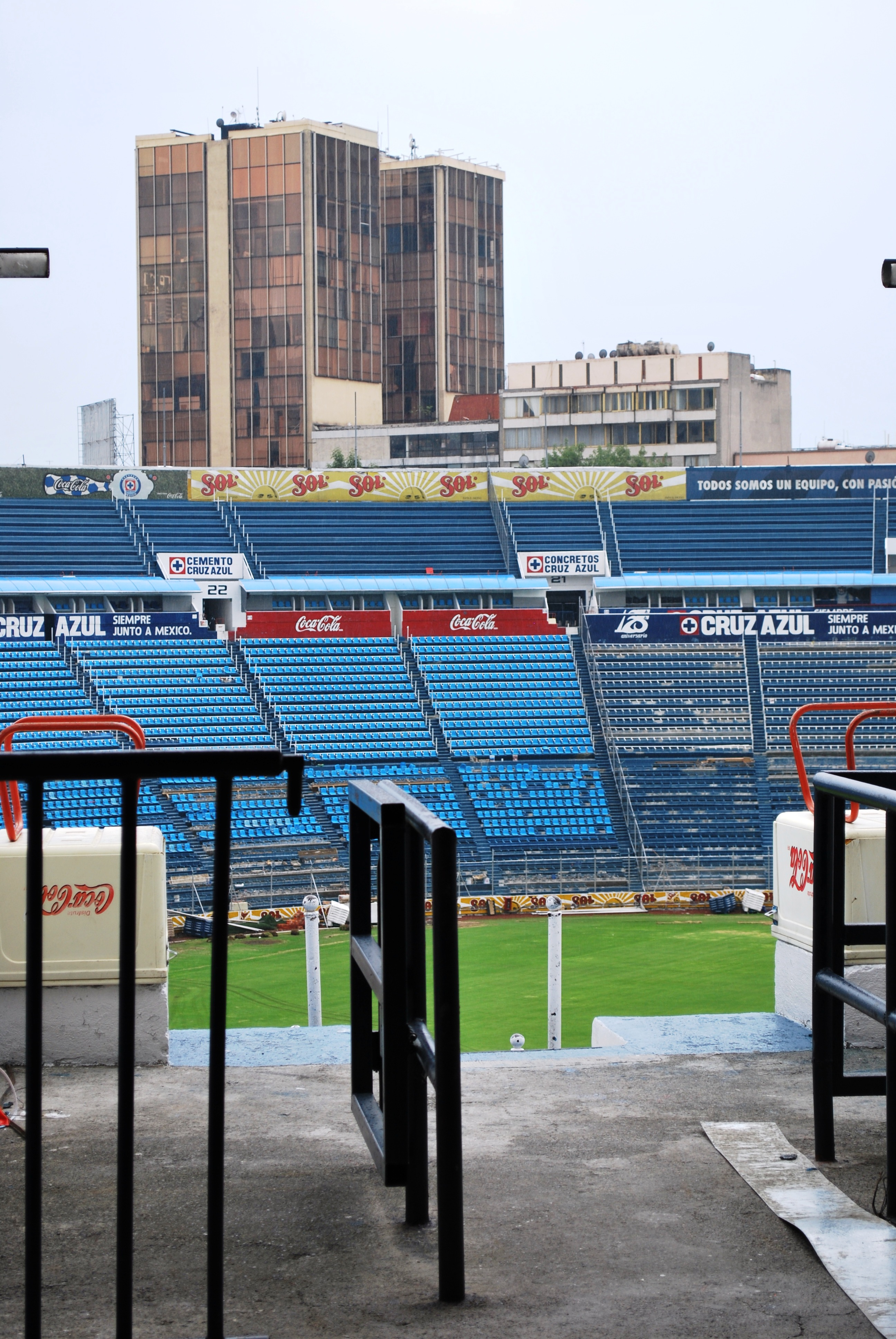
Interior from concourse

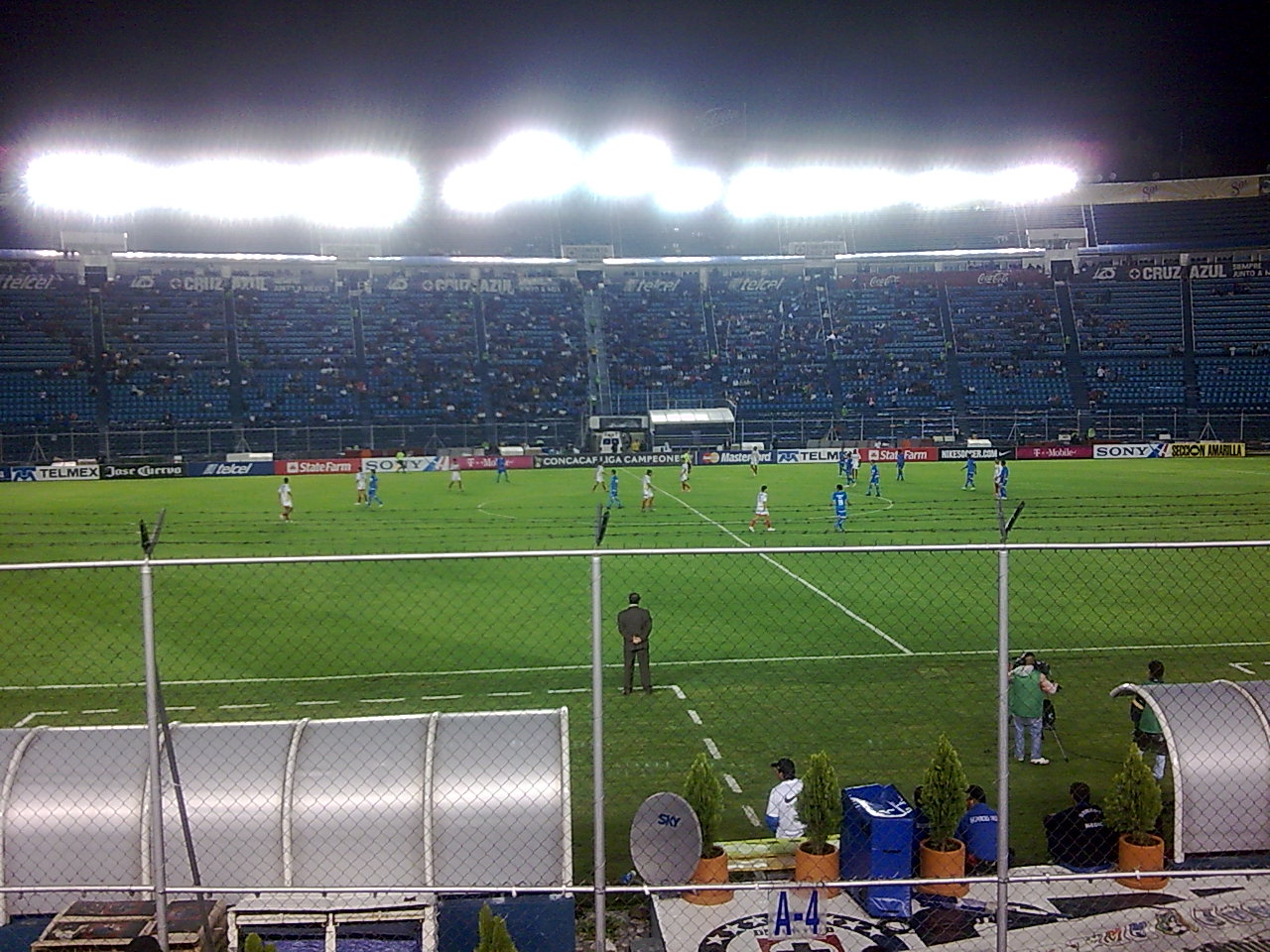
Interior from east section A

Logo under former name

== Infrastructure ==
Following the arrival of Cruz Azul, there have been many renovations to make the stadium safer, more comfortable, and appropriate to the needs of fans. Among these amenities are:

- Two professional football locker rooms
- Two locker rooms for referees
- A press conference room with seating capacity for 50 people
- A closed-circuit video system including seventy cameras
- Estadio Ciudad de los Deportes holds 34,253 people, including 92 boxes.

== See also ==
- List of football stadiums in Mexico
