= Escuela Mexicana del Valle / Americana =

Private school system in Colonia del Valle, Benito Juárez, Mexico City

Information
- Established: 1959; 66 years ago
- Website: https://www.ecagrupoeducativo.mx/ema

Escuela Mexicana del Valle (EMV)/Escuela Mexicana Americana (EMA) is a private school system in Colonia del Valle, Benito Juárez, Mexico City. It consists of seven campuses, and serves levels preschool until senior high school (preparatoria).

Escuela Mexicana Americana was first established with 35 students on October 20, 1959; Parroquia 812 was its first campus. In 1979 Escuela Mexicana del Valle was established.
