= Embilipitiya Maha Vidyalaya =

- Embilipitiya, Ratnapura District; Sabaragamuwa Province; Sri Lanka

Information
- Type: Government 1AB
- Founded: 1950 February 28
- Principal: Mr. P.G. Nihal Pitagampala
- Teaching staff: 95
- Grades: Grades 6-13
- Gender: Coeducational
- Language: Sinhala -English

Embilipitiya Maha Vidyalaya, or EMV, is a school in Sri Lanka which offers primary and secondary education. It was started in 1950 by Mr.Dissanayake. There was one building and forty children. It is one of the oldest schools in Ratnapura.
