= Parque Hundido =

Park in Mexico City

Coordinates: 19°22′41″N 99°10′44″W

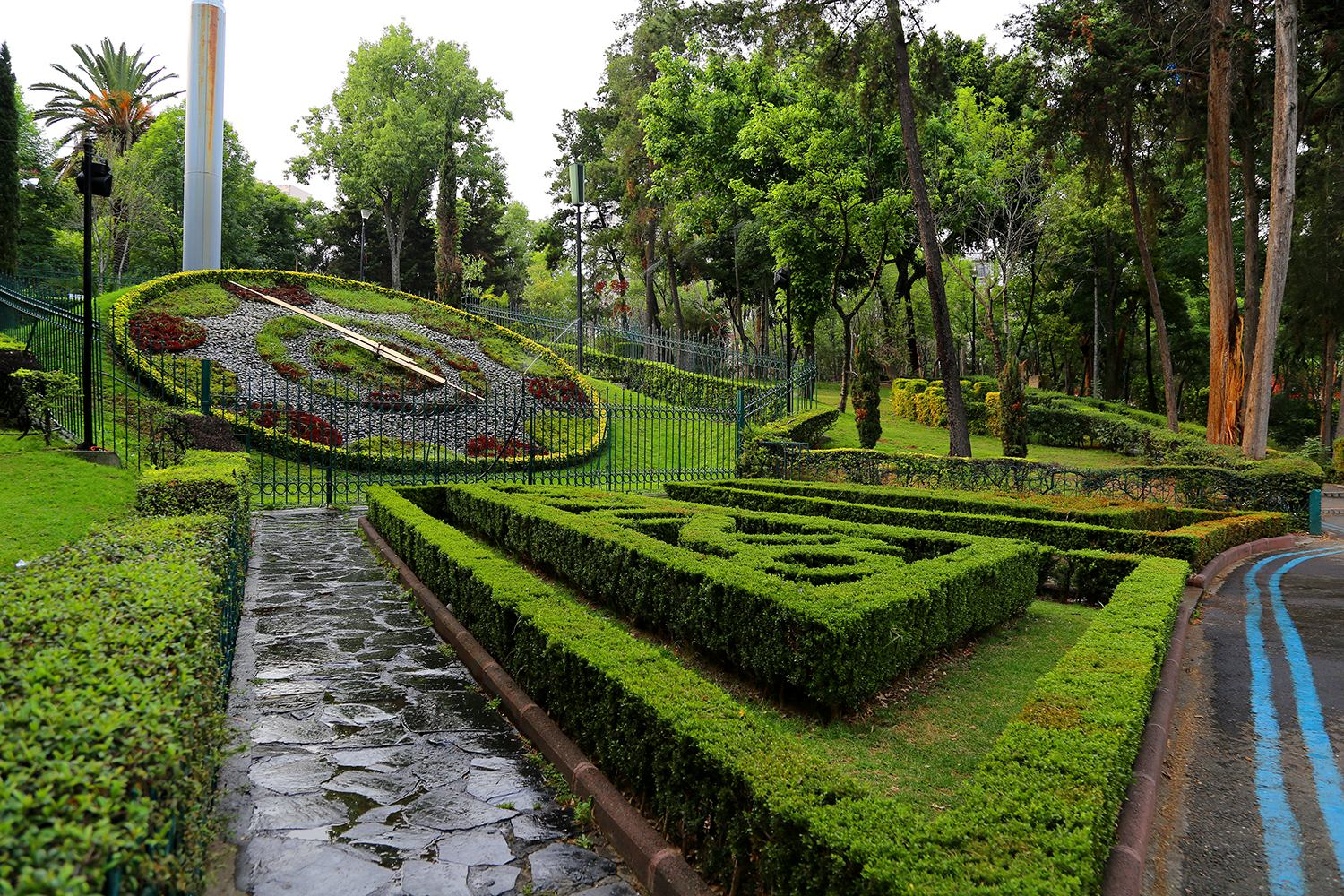
Floral clock of the park.

Parque Hundido (official name is Parque Luis G. Urbina) is an urban park located in Benito Juárez, Mexico City.

== Background ==
Its site was occupied by the brick-making company Ladrillera Nochebuena from the mid 19th century until the beginning of Porfiriato, when the brick company moved away and the site became an empty depression. By 1910, several species of trees were planted, creating the Nochebuena forest (Bosque de la Nochebuena). The area has been populated since late 18th century. However, the area was a collection of small towns and was, at that time, far away from Mexico City itself. In the late 1930s, having paved and widened Avenida de los Insurgentes, the city government decided to use the beautiful setting of the forest to create a new park. Its layout comprised gardens, walkways, a dual jai-alai/fronton court, and fountains for visitors to enjoy. In the late 1940s, when modern urbanization began around the park, it became known as the "Chinese Park", since its landscaping evoked Chinese gardens, but this changed in 1972, when several reproductions of archaeological pieces were placed in various parts of the park, though the layout was barely modified. Six walking routes were traced: the highlands, the Zapotec, Mayan, Olmec, Totonac, and Huastec, with artistic reproductions of pre-columbian stone work; each route was marked with a distinctively colored line on the floor. Today, these routes are used by runners and joggers.

== Features ==
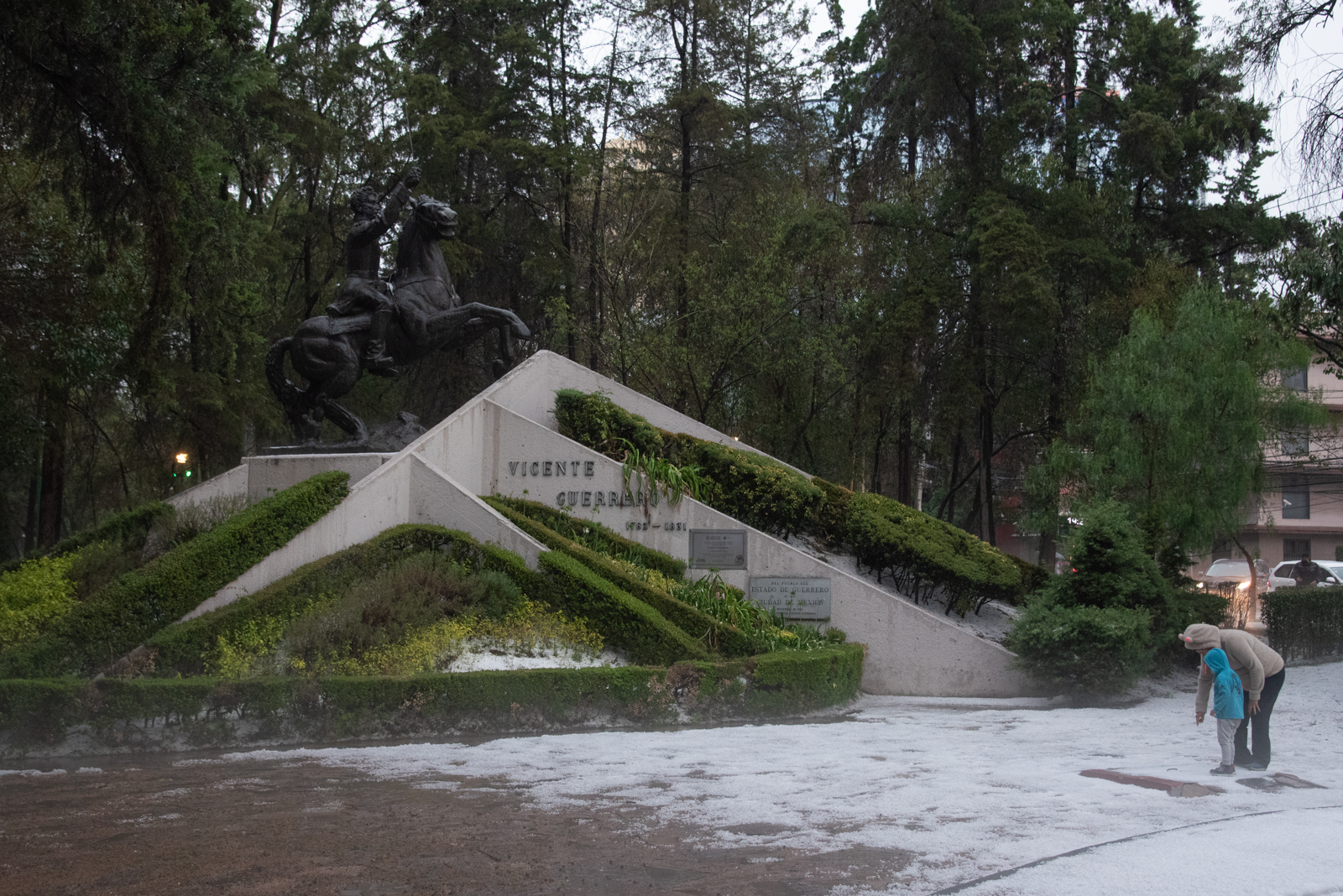
The Vicente Guerrero statue in June 2022

The main attraction is a floral clock, created by a prestigious watchmaker Relojes Centenario. It is located at the center of the park, near a flag pole (the highest point in the park) and at the end of a wide staircase that leads to Avenida de los Insurgentes via a small plaza named Plaza Dolores del Río, a tribute to one of the great divas of Hollywood and the Golden Age of Mexican cinema.

There is also an audiorama for up to 141 people, surrounded by lush vegetation, suitable for listening to classical music and poetry. It hosts a free cineclub that screens classic and contemporary Mexican and international film and events such as conferences, bingo games, some small-scale plays, workshops or jazz festivals.

A special area is reserved for off-leash dogs. A chess area and some concrete seating structures are also found in the park. In recent years, the children's playground was upgraded, EcoBici stations were added, a bike track was added and a restrooms were added. The park is home to a large number of birds, squirrels and lizards. There are also a large number of cats which are fed and kept inside the park.

The corner of Insurgentes Avenue and Porfirio Díaz Avenue, which is also part of the park, has been a busy rush-hour crossing since the Mexico City Metrobús opened in 2006, and includes a fountain and a statue of Vicente Guerrero on a horse, that was a gift from the State of Guerrero to Mexico City. This corner has, since the 1970s, been a meeting point for weekly Sunday bike rides. The AC Bicycletero Movement meets under the statue of the hero of Independence of Mexico, and under the name of Biciperros still perform Sunday walks that are free to all.
