= Pasaje Polanco =

Shopping court in Mexico City

Coordinates: 19°25′53″N 99°11′48″W

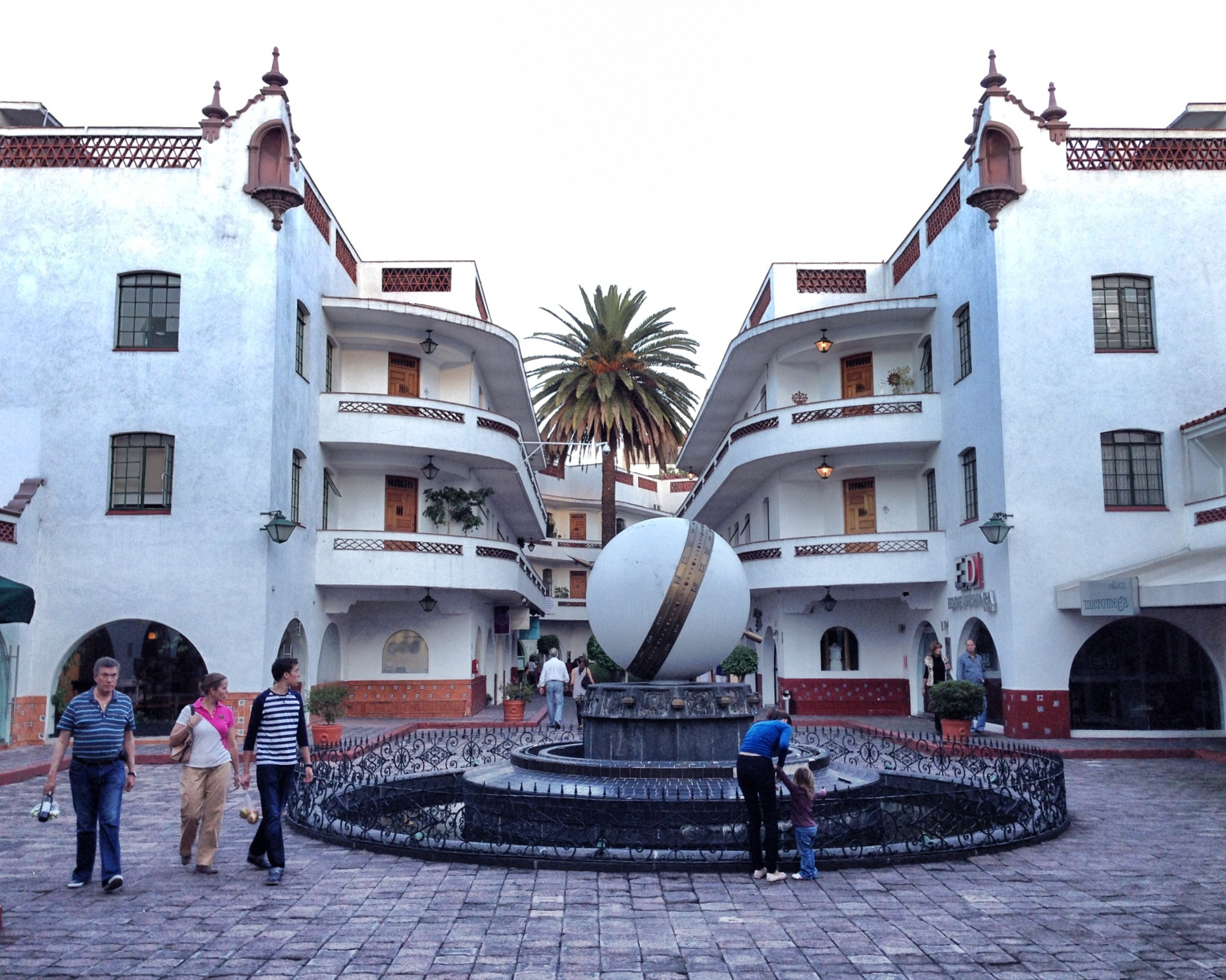
Pasaje Comercial along Avenida Presidente Masaryk in the Polanquito district of Polanco, built in 1938 in Colonial Californiano style

Pasaje Polanco, originally Pasaje Comercial, is an architecturally significant open-air shopping court with apartments on the upper levels along Avenida Masaryk in the Polanquito section of the Polanco neighborhood of Mexico City. It opened in 1938; Francisco J. Serrano was the architect. It is in Colonial californiano style, that is, a Mexican interpretation of the California interpretation of Spanish Colonial Revival architecture and Mission Revival architecture. It consists of an interior courtyard around which there are shops, restaurants, and cafés, with apartments on the upper floors. Shops on the Masaryk Avenue side also have entrances on that street, one of the city's most famous for luxury shopping.
