= Plaza Uruguay =

Park in Mexico City

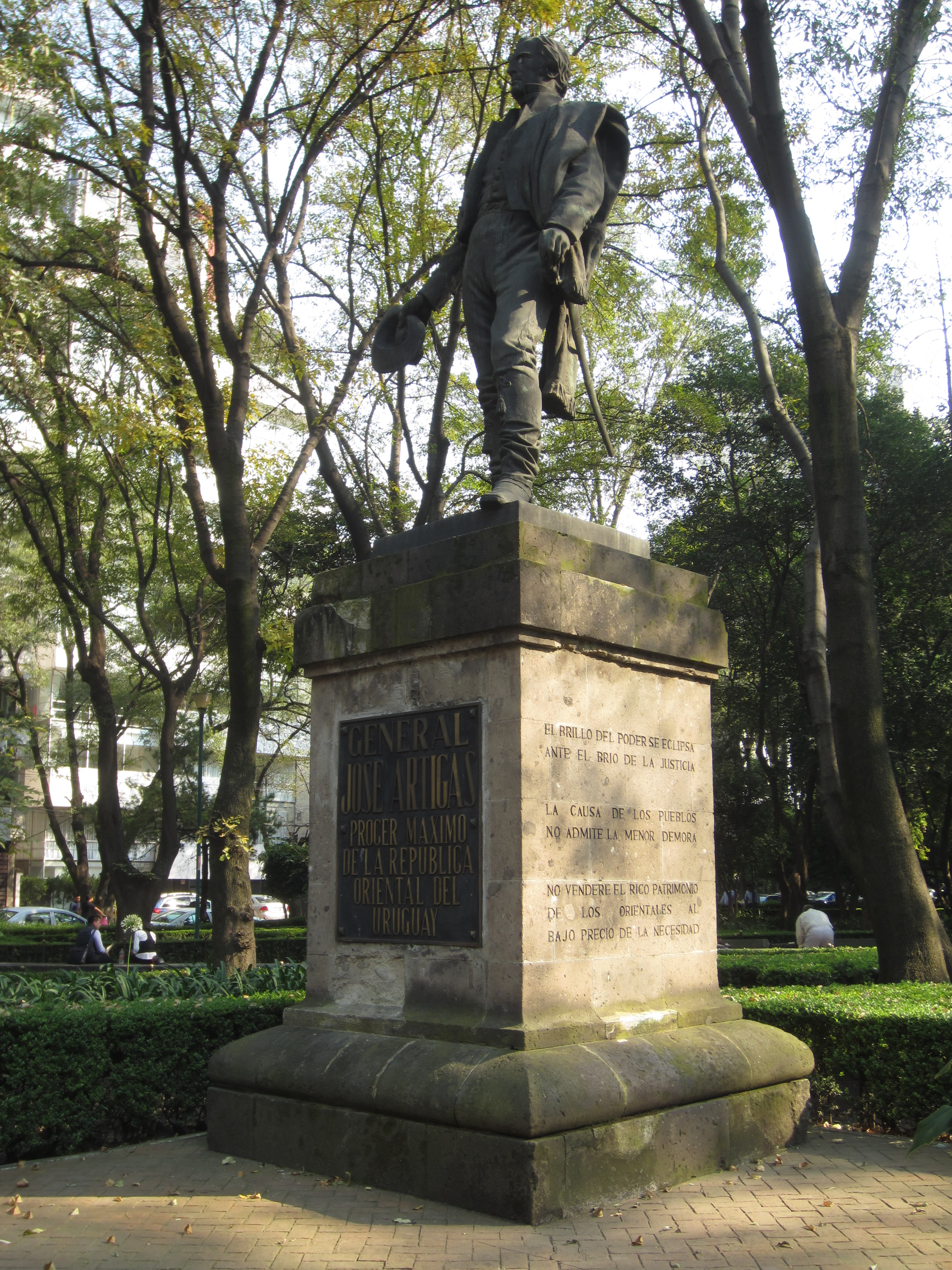
- The statue of José Gervasio Artigas in 2018
- Interactive map of Plaza Uruguay
- Type: Public park
- Location: Polanco, Mexico City
- Coordinates: 19°25′58″N 99°11′16″W
- Owner: Government of Mexico City
- Public transit: Polanco
- Website: plazauruguay.com

Plaza Uruguay is a public park along Avenida Horacio and the streets of Hegel, Lope de Vega and Ibarbourou, in Polanco, Mexico City, Mexico. The park commemorates the Uruguayans who emigrated to Mexico during the civic-military dictatorship of Uruguay (1973–1985); its name honors the relations between Mexico and Uruguay. The park was established in the late 1930s, alongside the development of the neighborhood, on land that formerly belonged to the Hacienda de los Morales.

In the park, there is a bronze sculpture depicting José Gervasio Artigas (1764–1850), the national hero of Uruguay. It was sculpted by Armando González and was donated by the government of Uruguay.

Inside the park, there are benches, and writers have described it as quiet and with shade-providing trees. Families commonly visit the park but there is no playground equipment for children.

In the middle is a square fountain, featuring a brutalist and cubist monument. There is no information available regarding the monument's creator or when it was erected.

The park is near the Polanco metro station. Opposite the park is the seafood restaurant Entremar, a sister restaurant of Contramar, and Tango y Milonga, an Uruguayan restaurant.

Fountain, 2018

== See also ==
- Parque América
- Parque Lincoln
