= Statue of José Gervasio Artigas =

The statue of José Gervasio Artigas may refer to:

- Statue of José Gervasio Artigas, Mexico City, Mexico
- Statue of José Gervasio Artigas (Washington, D.C.), United States
- A statue of Artigas located outside General Artigas railway station, Montevideo, Uruguay
