= Polanco =

Neighborhood in Mexico City

- Neighborhood
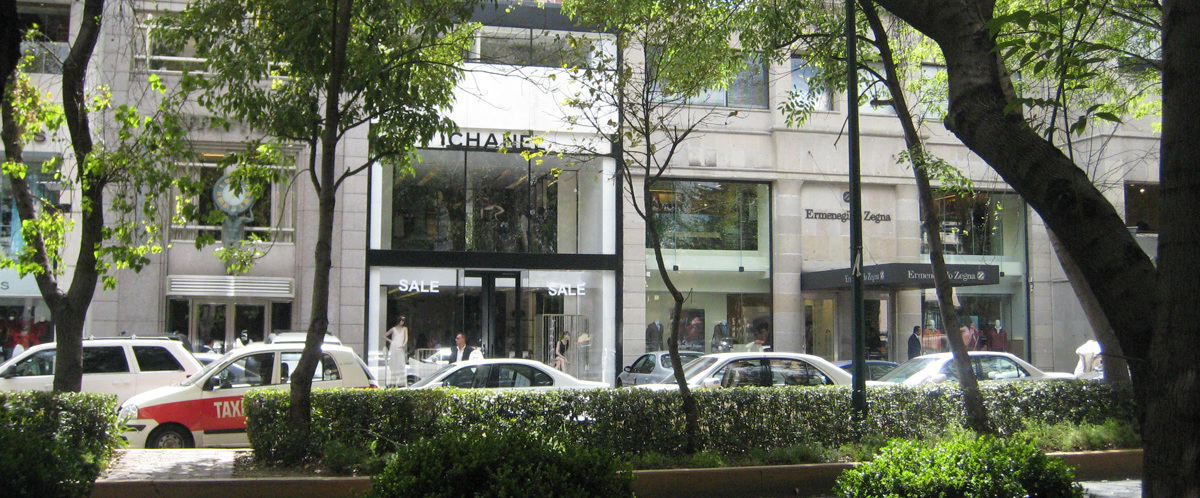
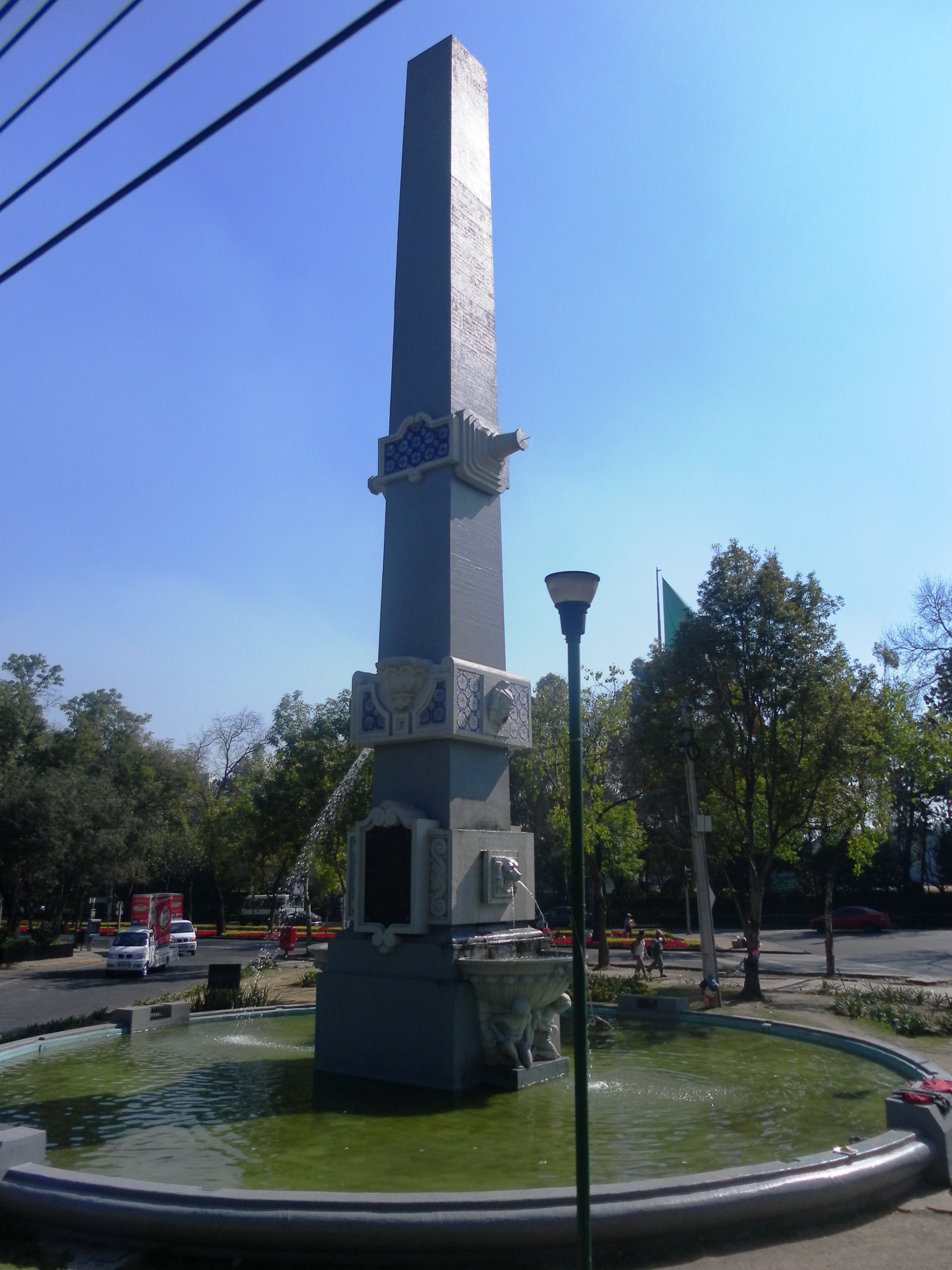
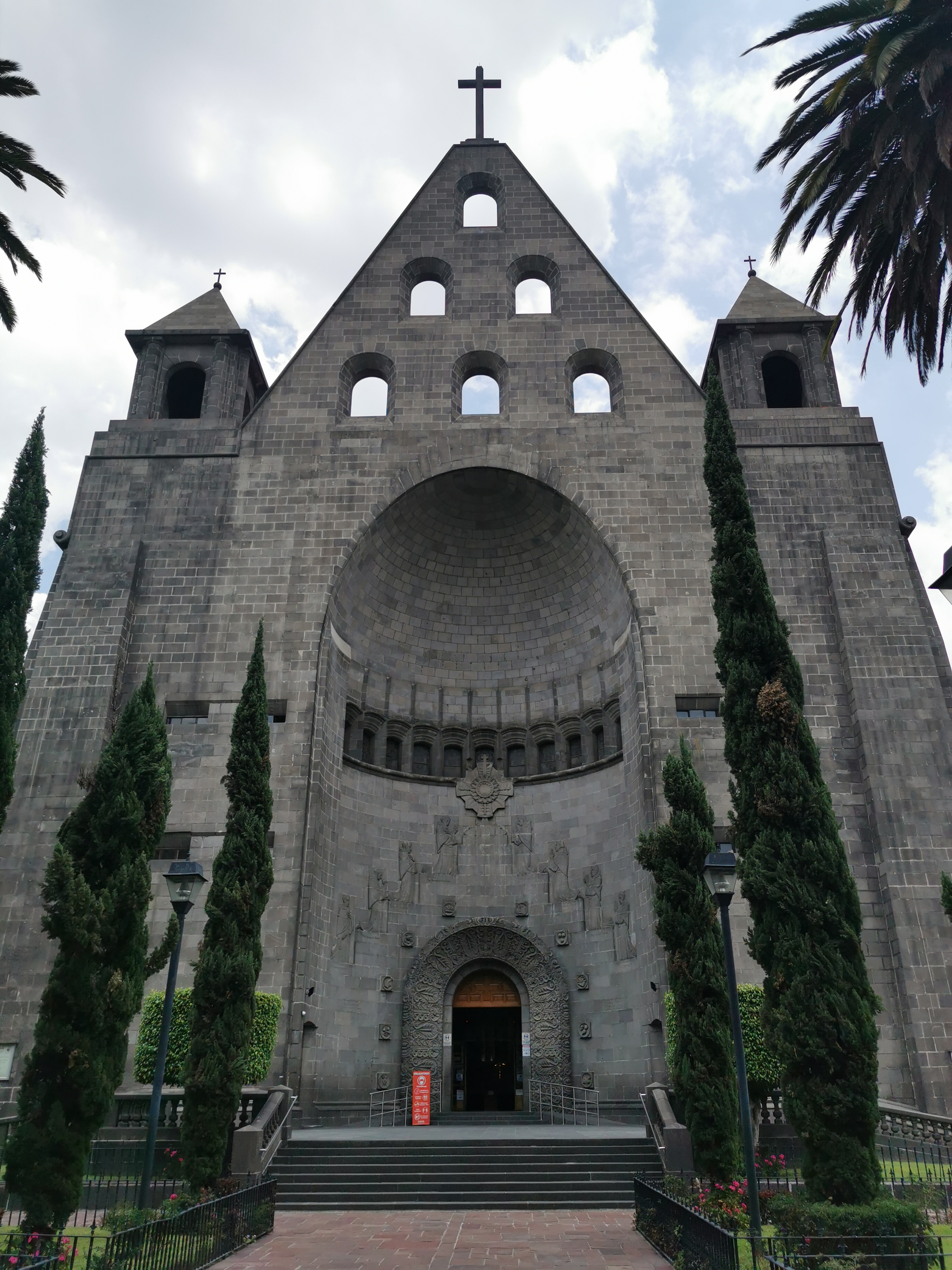
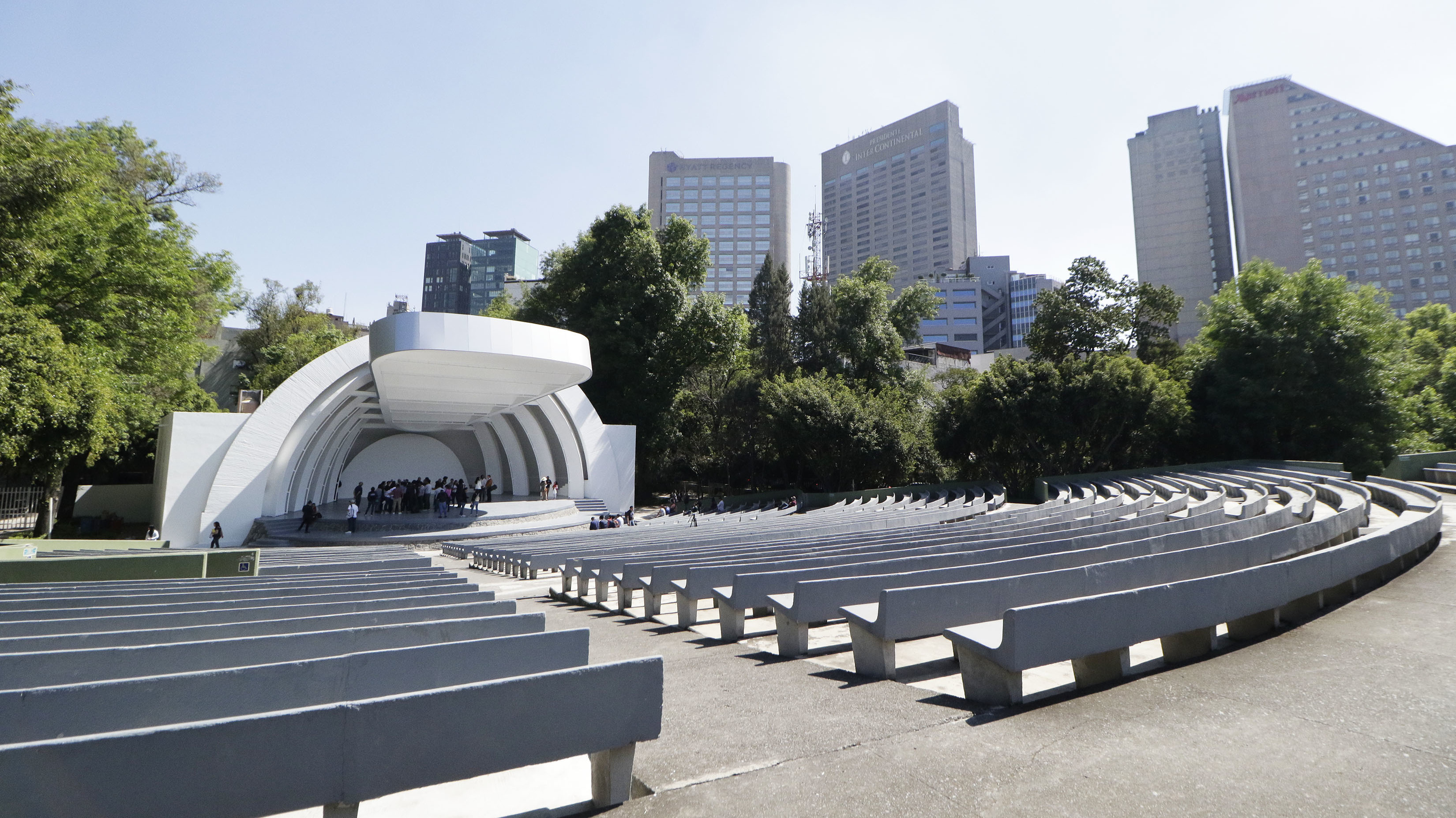
- Clockwise from top: Shops along Avenida Presidente Masaryk; St. Augustine Parish; Angela Peralta Amphitheater in Parque Lincoln; and Obelisk to Simón Bolivar at the Paseo de la Reforma entrance to Polanco
- Location in Mexico City
- Coordinates: 19°26′02″N 99°11′48″W
- Country: Mexico
- City: Mexico City
- Borough: Miguel Hidalgo

Population (2020)
  - Total: 32,019
- Website: http://www.polanco-online.com.mx

Polanco is a neighborhood in the Miguel Hidalgo borough of Mexico City. Polanco is an affluent colonia, noted for its luxury shopping along Presidente Masaryk Avenue, the most expensive street in Mexico, as well as for the numerous prominent cultural institutions located within the neighborhood.

Originally a residential area of large single-family homes, the land use of the neighborhood began to change in the second half of the 20th century. Particularly after the 1985 Mexico City earthquake, the former residences were replaced by commercial properties and high rise buildings. Today, Polanco is best known as a shopping district.

Polanco is known for having one of the country's densest concentrations of luxury shopping, with the most upscale restaurants, high-net-worth individuals, upscale hotels, and diplomatic missions and embassies. It is one of the most expensive real estate markets in Latin America.

A newer development north of Polanco, popularly termed "Nuevo Polanco", is a business district that is home to BBVA, WeWork and Telecel while also housing important cultural institutions such as the Museo Soumaya and the Colección Jumex. Nuevo Polanco, officially in the colonias of Granada and Ampliación Granada, is not part of the Polanco neighborhood. However, Polanco and Nuevo Polanco are sometimes grouped together.

== History ==
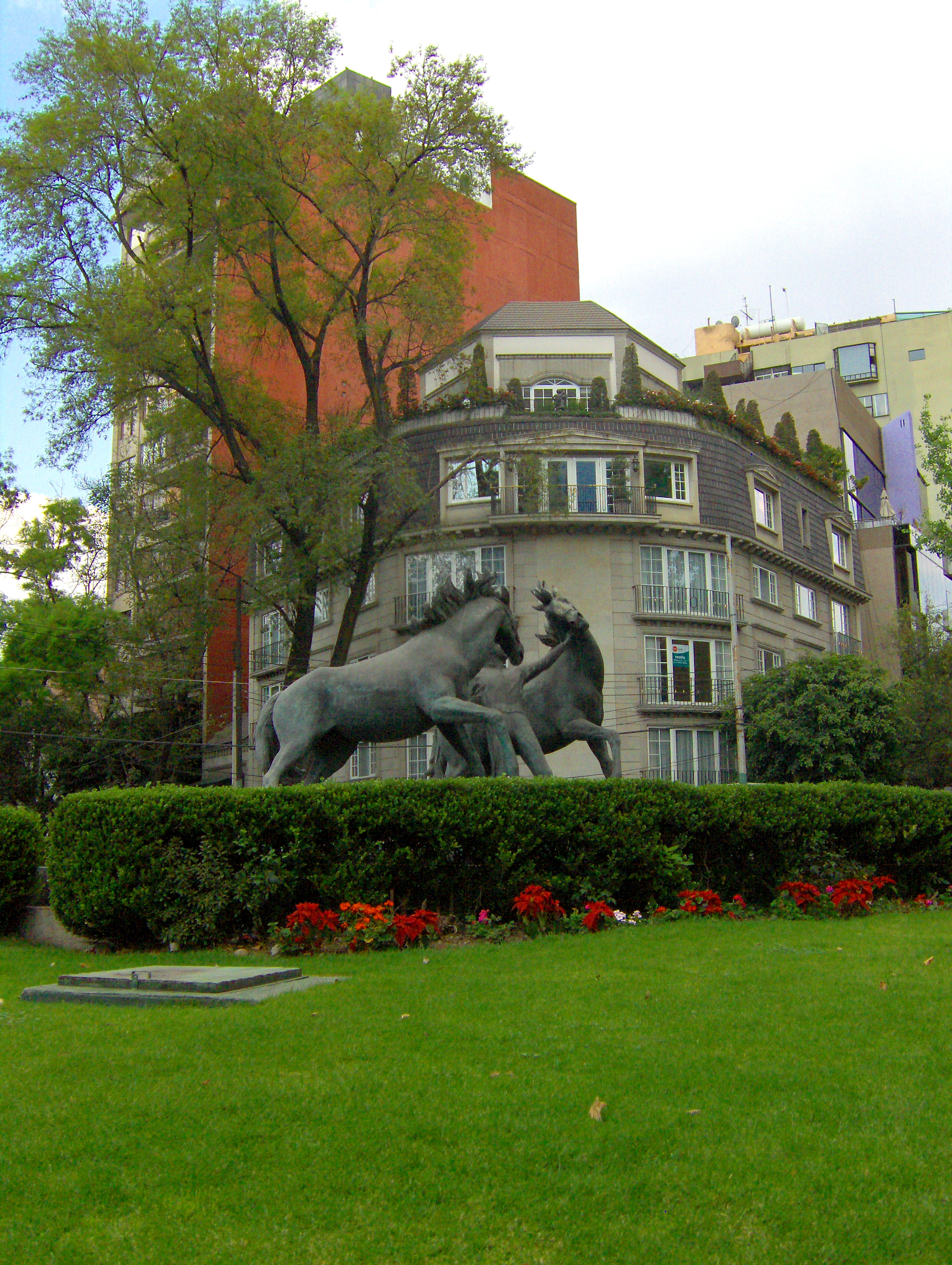
Plaza Campos Eliseos in Polanco

The colonia takes its name from a river that crossed what is now the Avenue Campos Elisios (Elysian Fields Avenue), named in memory of the Spanish Jesuit Juan Alfonso de Polanco, a secretary of Ignatius of Loyola, whose relatives, members of the Polanco family, were members of board of the Kings of Spain in the 17th century and came to Mexico as officers of the Crown.

In a plan made by Francisco Antonio de Guerrero y Torres and dated 1784, a "ruined house Polanco" is located on the grounds of the Hacienda de San Juan de los Morales. This hacienda sits on land donated in the sixteenth century to Hernán Cortés by the King of Spain, under the jurisdiction of Tacuba. At the beginning of the colonial times, parts of this land (near the current center of the Hacienda) were occupied for planting mulberry trees for breeding silkworms (hence the name "los morales"). The hull of the Hacienda as currently known dates from the eighteenth century. Extension lands belonging to the estate began to be divided in the late 1920s.

Polanco was developed in 1937 by the Aleman family, the same developers of Ciudad Satélite and San José Insurgentes districts, on the land that was originally the Hacienda de los Morales, just north of Molino del Rey town and Bosque de Chapultepec. The first area to be built is now called Polanco Reforma and lies just north of Paseo de la Reforma, the entrance to the new neighborhood marked by a tiled obelisk to Simon Bolivar facing Reforma. In those days, there were only mansions surrounded by gardens and tree lined streets.

By the 1960s, the first department store arrived in the neighborhood, forever transforming the face of Polanco. In the 1970s, the last piece of land to be developed was sold, the triangle of Ejército Nacional, Ferrocarril de Cuernavaca and Periférico, where no stand-alone housing was built, only apartment buildings.

The 1985 Mexico City earthquake reshaped the city layout, and Polanco was no exception; restaurants, embassies, boutiques and corporate business slowly moved from Zona Rosa and established themselves in Polanco. Big houses were torn down and replaced with new buildings. The former inhabitants typically moved to neighborhoods such as Bosques de las Lomas and Lomas de Tecamachalco.

Land prices have become some of the most expensive in the city, as zoning rules forbid skyscrapers in the area. There are few mansions remaining which are protected by INBA, therefore large building projects cannot be undertaken like the ones in Lomas de Chapultepec, or Santa Fe, two areas which have an edge on attracting new inhabitants. Ruben Darío Avenue, facing Chapultepec Park, and Campos Eliseos Avenue are two of the most expensive streets in Mexico City, with apartments ranging up to US$15 million.

== Geography ==
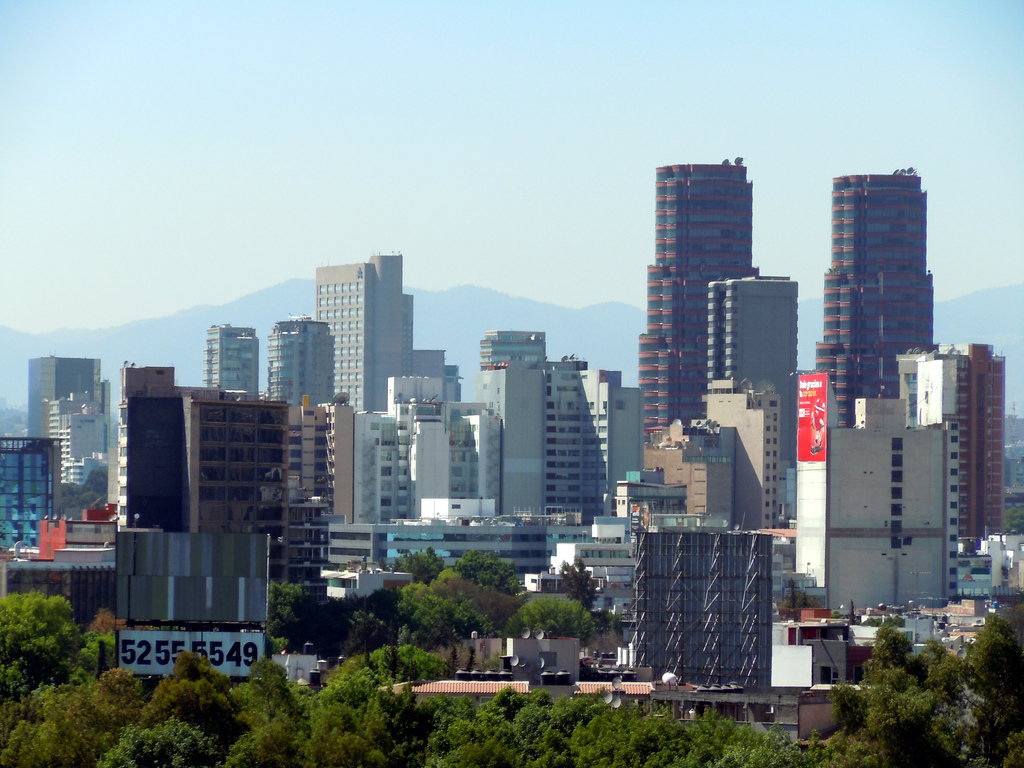
View of the Polanco skyline

Polanco consists of five officially recognized colonias, called "Polanco I Sección", "Polanco II Sección", "Polanco III Sección", "Polanco IV Sección", and "Polanco V Sección".

The borders of Polanco are:

- On the north, Avenida Ejército Nacional and the Nuevo Polanco area as well as Colonia Irrigación
- On the south, Paseo de la Reforma
- On the east, Avenida General Mariano Escobedo and Colonia Anzures
- On the west, Blvd. Manuel Ávila Camacho (Anillo Periférico) and the colonias of Lomas de Chapultepec, Reforma Social and Residencia Militar

Formerly Polanco contained nine colonias whose names were: Bosque de Chapultepec, Bosque de Chapultepec Polanco, Chapultepec Morales, Chapultepec Polanco, Los Morales - Sección Palmas, Los Morales - Sección Alameda, Polanco Reforma, Polanco Chapultepec, and Rincón del Bosque.

=== Polanquito ===
Polanquito ("little Polanco") is the informal name for the restaurant and shopping area around Pasaje Polanco, including such streets as Julio Verne and Oscar Wilde. The nickname first meant the Pasaje itself; it caught on in the early 2000s, when Condesa and Roma came back into fashion, and now also covers the businesses around it. The area is clustered around Parque Lincoln on narrow, walkable streets lined with art nouveau, art deco, baroque and functionalist buildings. It is one of the city's best-known places to eat out.

=== Nuevo Polanco ===
Nuevo Polanco is an area bordering Polanco to the north across Avenida Ejercito Nacional. It contains the Antara Polanco and Plaza Carso shopping malls, the Museo Soumaya and Museo Jumex, establishments which are sometimes incorrectly reported as being in the Polanco neighborhood.

== Demographics ==
The population of Polanco is 27,322, distributed as follows across the colonias:

- Zone I: 5,385
- Zone II: 4,943
- Zone III: 3,603
- Zone IV: 3,634
- Zone V: 9,757

== Culture ==
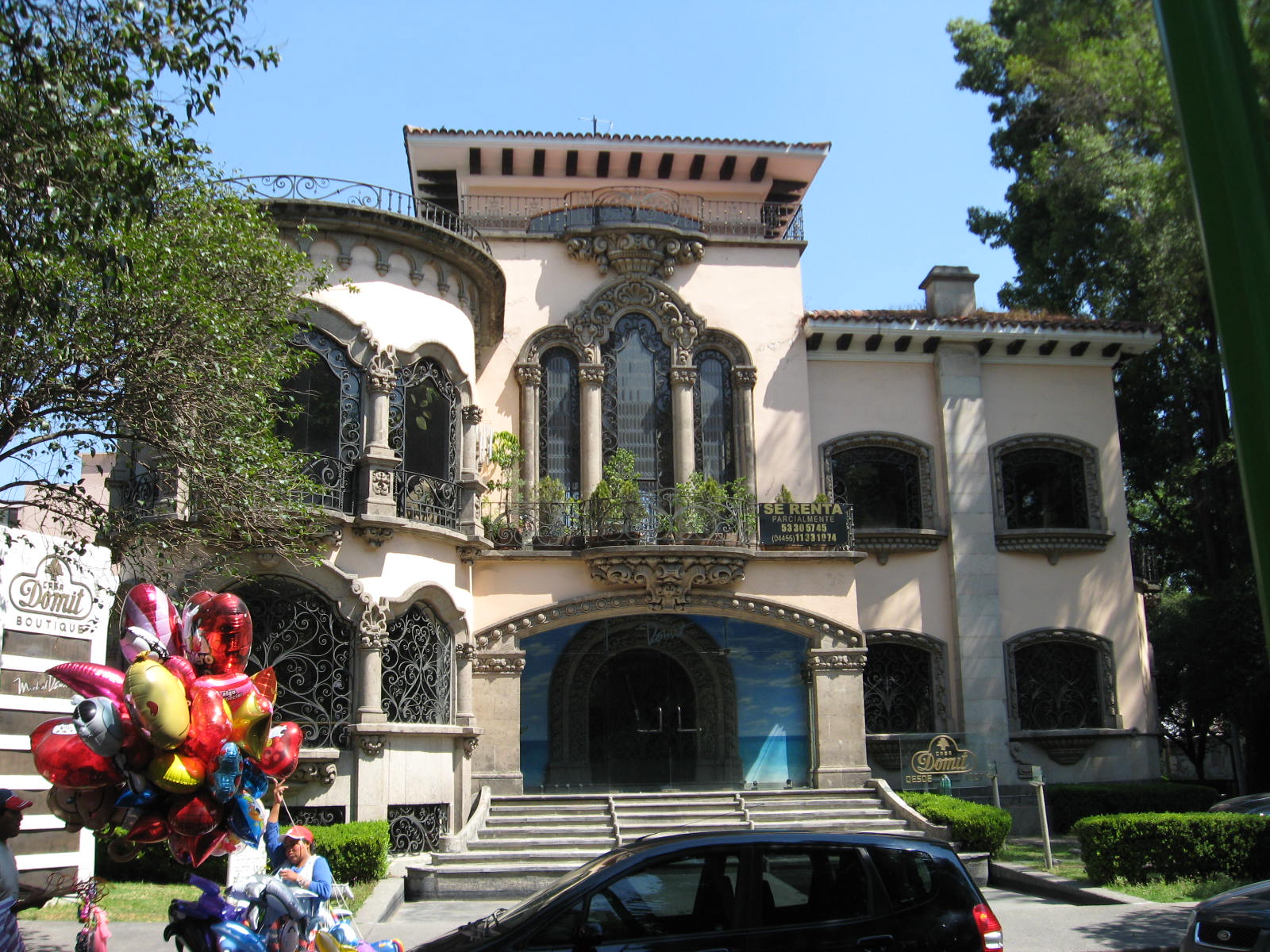
A boutique housed in a former colonial californiano residence

=== Architecture ===
Polanco enjoyed a construction boom in the 1940s, when large single-family residences were built. The architectural style of most of these buildings was "Colonial Californiano", inspired by the Mission Revival Style in the Southwestern United States, with pseudo-baroque quarry windows, front-side gardens and inside halls. Some of these mansions have been renovated and converted into businesses and restaurants; many others have simply been torn down and replaced with new buildings.

=== Restaurants ===
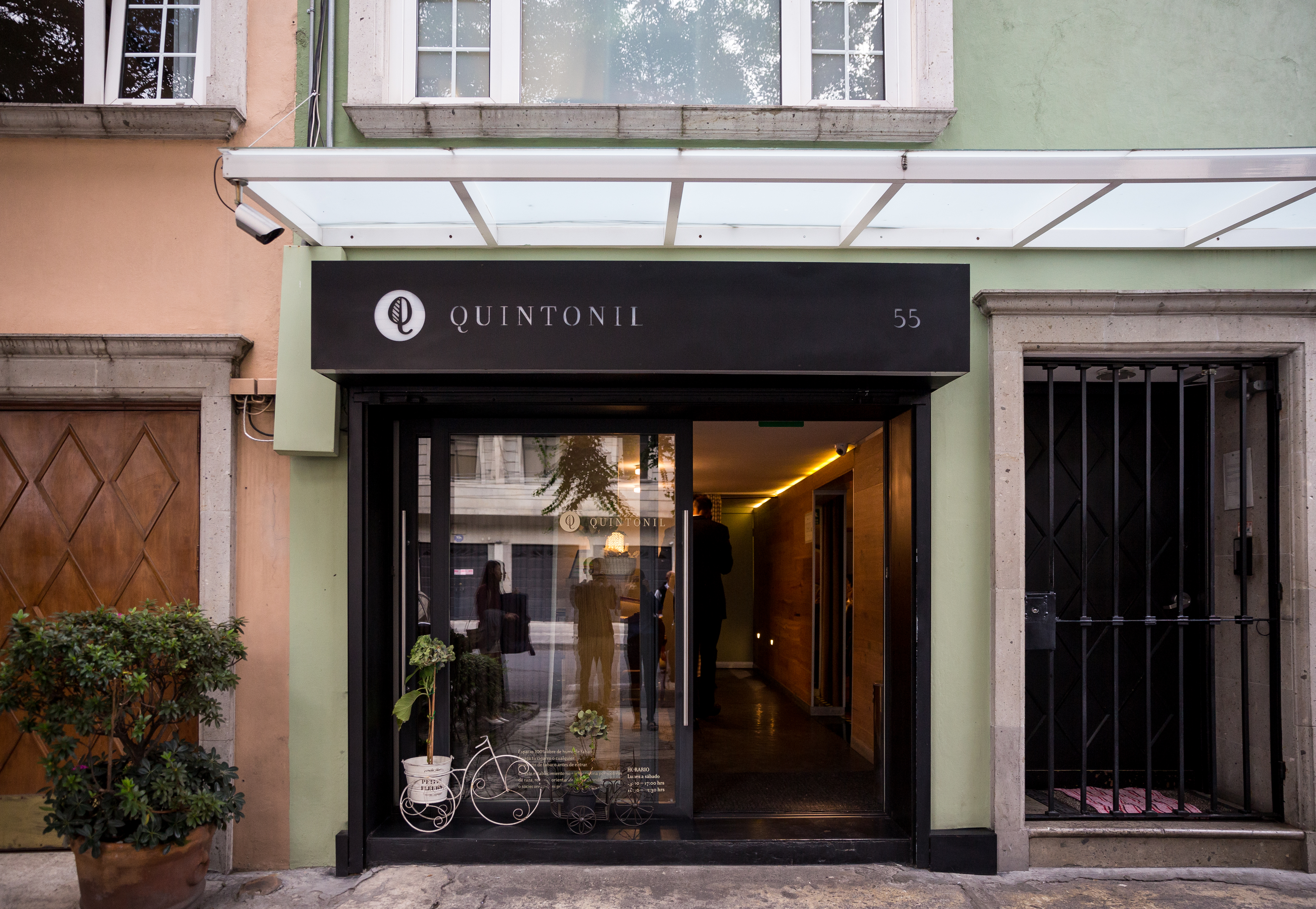
Exterior entrance of Quintonil

Notable restaurants in Polanco include Au Pied de Cochon, Pujol, Quintonil, Nobu, and Morimoto.

Frequently named as the bests restaurants in Mexico, in 2022 Pujol ranked 5th in The World's 50 Best Restaurants, while Quintonil was ranked 3rd in 2025. Both restaurants were awarded two Michelin stars in 2024.

=== Parks ===
Part of the city's iconic park, Chapultepec, falls within Polanco's borders.

Parque Lincoln is the neighborhood park most associated with Polanco. The park's clock tower has become a symbol of Polanco.

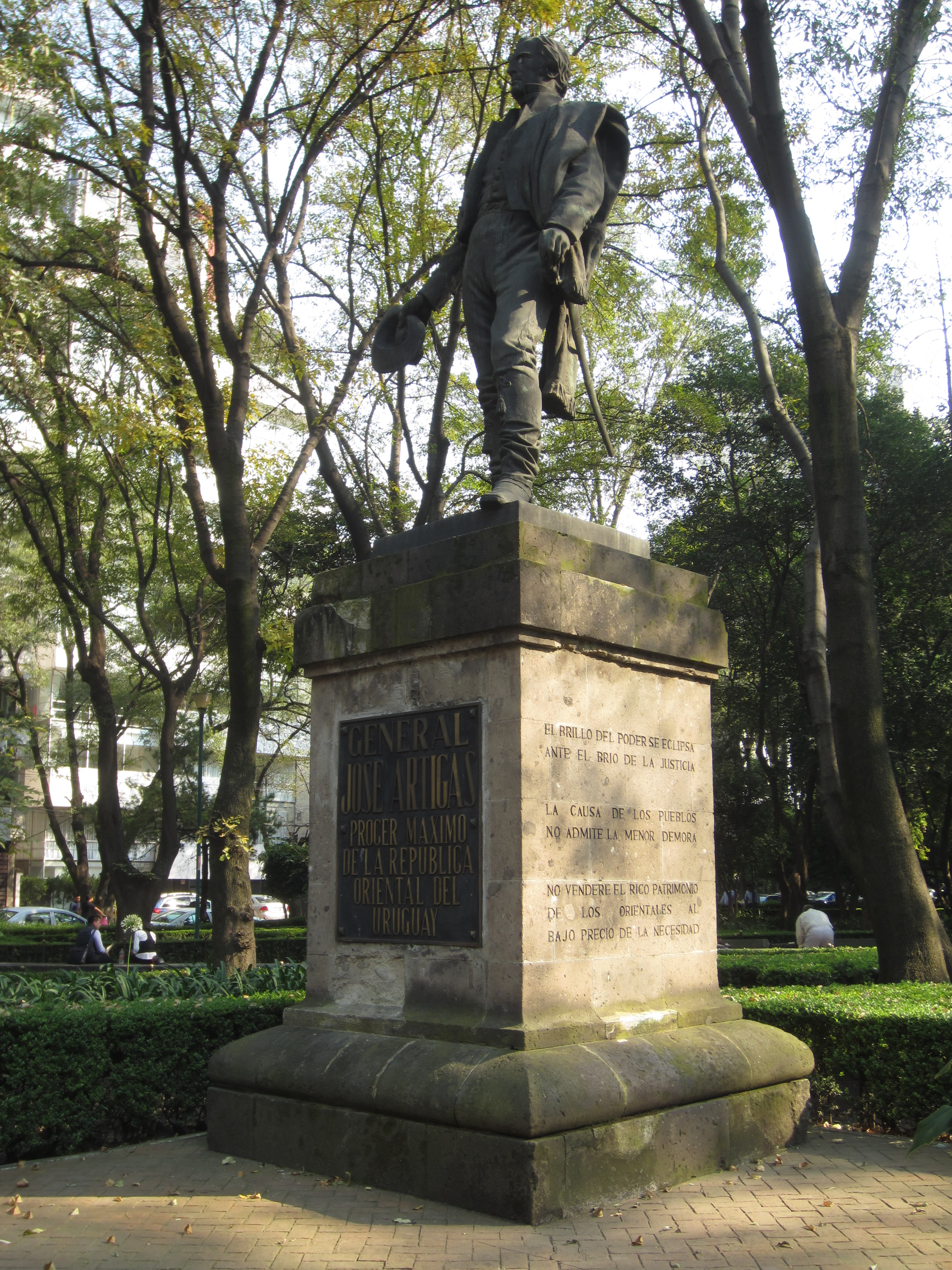
The statue of José Gervasio Artigas in 2018

Other parks in Polanco are the smaller Parque América, Parque Machado and the Plaza Uruguay. Plaza Uruguay features a bronze sculpture depicting José Gervasio Artigas, a national hero of Uruguay.

=== Museums ===
The most important cultural institution located in the neighborhood is the National Museum of Anthropology, located in the area of Chapultepec Park that is officially part of Polanco.

Other institutions located in Polanco include the Museo Tamayo (in Chapultepec) and the Sala de Arte Público Siqueiros (highlighting the work of David Alfaro Siqueiros).

== Government ==
The address of the Campo Marte, a venue under the administration of the Secretariat of National Defense (SEDENA) is in Polanco. A Field of Mars, it is used for military and government events, as well as equestrian events.

== Economy ==
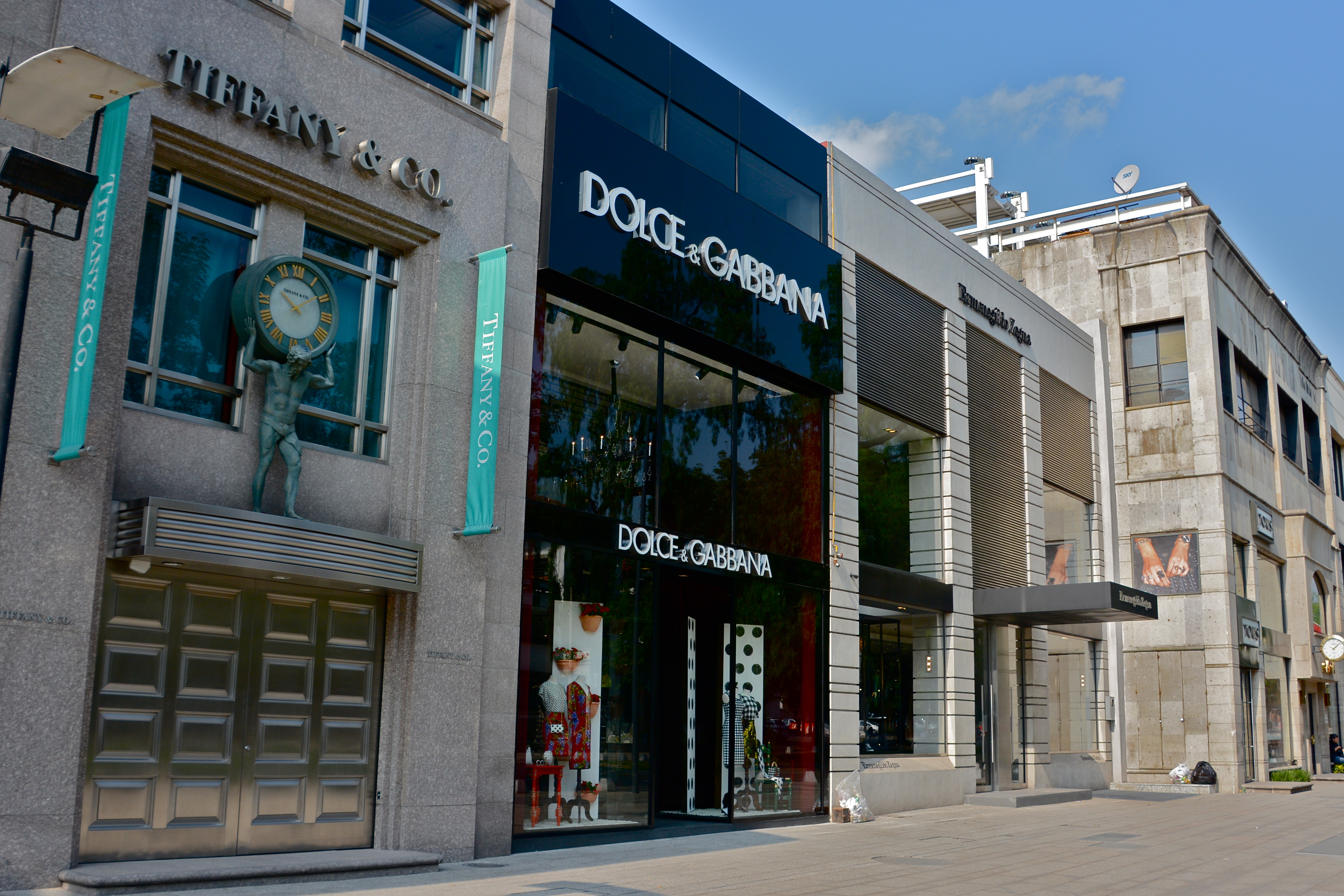
Luxury shops on Av. Presidente Masaryk

In addition to the above-mentioned shopping and dining, Polanco and Nuevo Polanco together are one of the primary areas for Class A office space in the city and metro area. As of 2017 Polanco was the second fastest-growing area of new construction of office space. Samsung, Coca-Cola, Visa, GM, Nestlé, Telmex/Grupo Carso and many more multinationals have their headquarters in the middle of Polanco.

=== Shopping ===
==== Avenida Presidente Masaryk ====
The highest-priced street and the one with the most upscale boutiques in Latin America, it is compared by some to Beverly Hills' Rodeo Drive or New York City's Fifth Avenue. The Avenue was named by President Lázaro Cárdenas in honor of Tomáš Masaryk, the first President of Czechoslovakia.

Shops include Louis Vuitton, Cartier, Chanel, Corneliani, Salvatore Ferragamo, Tiffany & Co., DKNY, Ermenegildo Zegna, Brioni, Burberry, Bulgari, Chopard, Gucci, Hermès, Frette, Marc Jacobs, Max Mara, Hugo Boss, Rolex, Jaeger Le Coultre, Galerias Tehran, and Berger Joyeros.

==== Freestanding department stores ====
Measuring 55,248 m^{2}, the largest department store in Latin America is the flagship Palacio de Hierro Polanco, designed by Javier Sordo Madaleno.

Polanco also has a freestanding Liverpool department store, which at 37,000 m2 is the largest in the chain.

There is a Sears in the Pabellón Polanco mall. The defunct París-Londres had a branch in Polanco at Horacio 203, now an Innovasport superstore, as did Saks Fifth Avenue from 2010 to 2020.

==== Shopping centers ====
Shopping centers include:

- Galerías Polanco, adjacent to Liverpool Polanco
- Pabellón Polanco, anchored by Sears and Cinemex cinemas
- Pasaje Polanco, originally called simply the Pasaje Comercial, a smaller but historic collection of shops around a courtyard, built in 1938 in Colonial Californiano style (Mexican interpretation of California Spanish Colonial Revival architecture) It encompasses a block located south of Avenida Pdt. Masaryk toward Avenida Emilio Castelar.

Four other large shopping centers are located across the street from the northern edge of Polanco: Antara, Plaza Carso, Miyana and Centro Comercial Polanco.

== Transportation ==
Polanco is bordered on the west by the Anillo Periférico ring road and the Avenida Río San Joaquín freeway is just to the north, connecting the Periférico via Polanco to central Mexico City. Main east-west thoroughfares include (south to north:) Paseo de la Reforma, Avenida Presidente Masaryk, Ave. Horacio, Ave. Homero, and Ave. Ejercito Nacional. Main north-south thoroughfares include (east to west): General Mariano Escobedo, Molière, Ferrocarril de Cuernavaca and Juan Vásquez Mella.

=== Public transit ===
Polanco is served by the Polanco and Auditorio stations of the Mexico City metro (subway). The western terminus of the double decker buses of the Reforma line of the Metrobús (bus rapid transit) is in Polanco. Peseros (minibuses), city buses and trolleybuses ply numerous streets in Polanco continuing to and from other parts of the city.

== Education ==
Schools in Polanco include:

- Lycée Franco-Mexicain (Liceo Franco Mexicano)
- Colegio Ciudad de México Plantel Polanco
- Conservatorio Nacional de Música

== In popular culture ==
The mansion of The Exterminating Angel, the main setting of the 1962 Luis Buñuel film, is in Polanco. The address of the building is on Homero Avenue (formerly Rocafuerte Avenue), although it is no longer visible from street level as the mansion's former gardens are now occupied by high rise buildings.

== Gallery ==
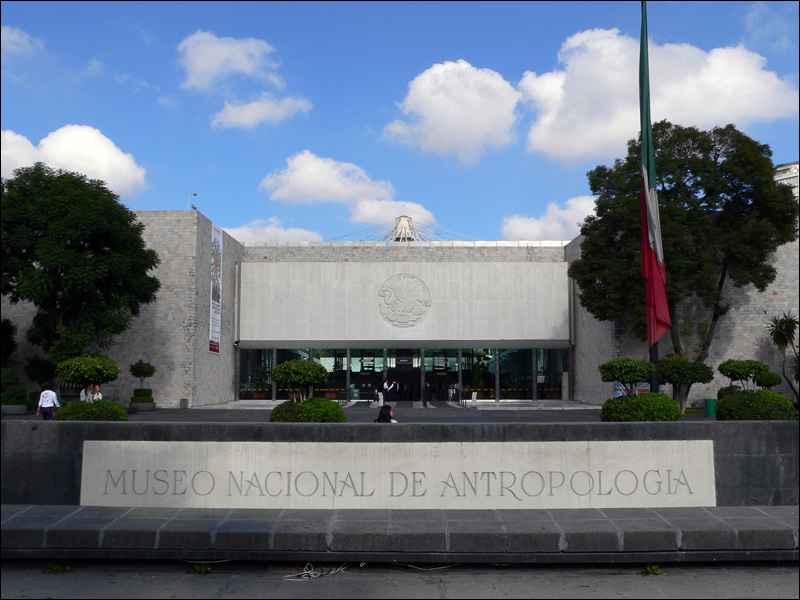
National Museum of Anthropology

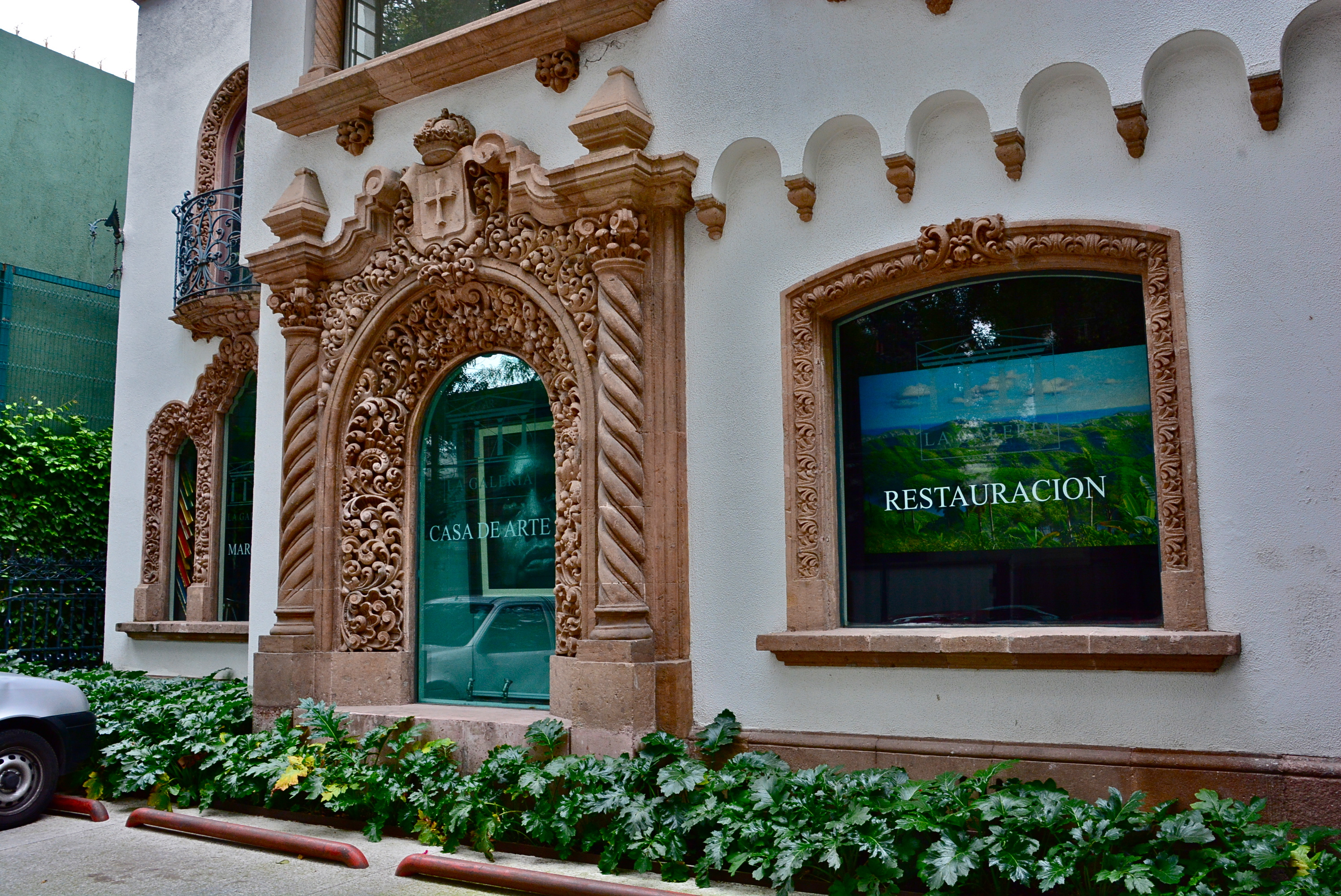
Casa de Arte

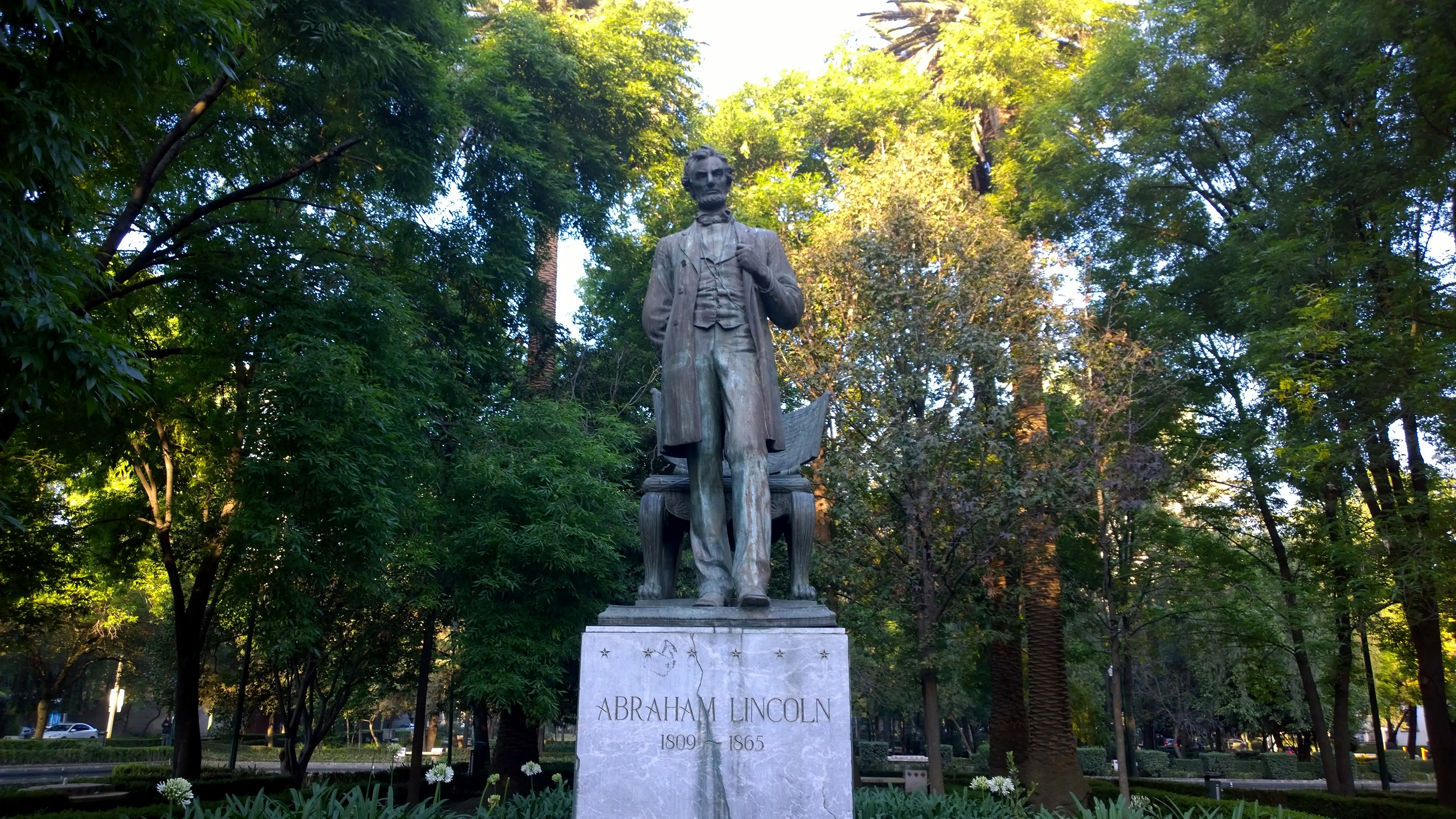
Parque Lincoln

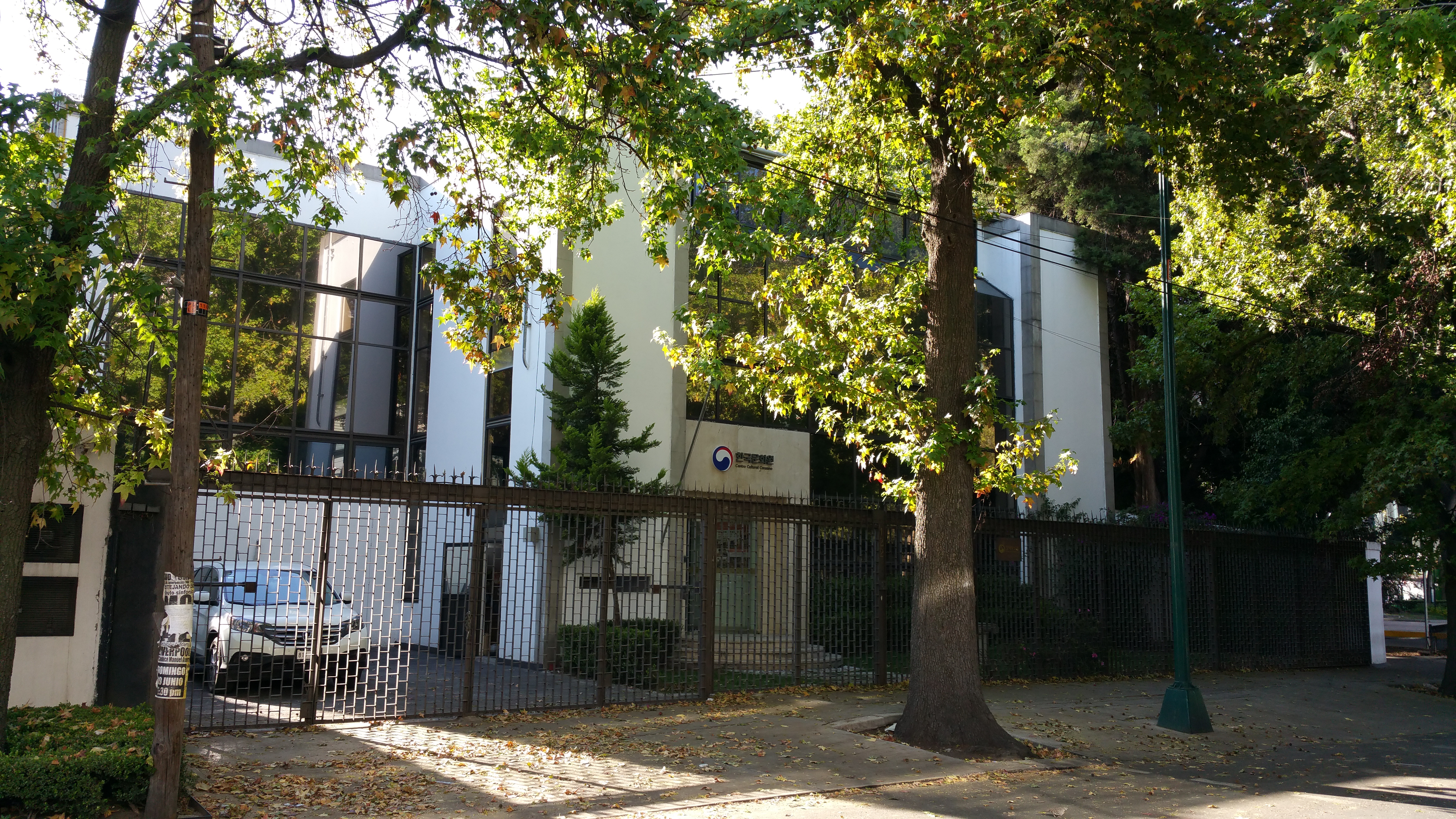
Korean Cultural Center

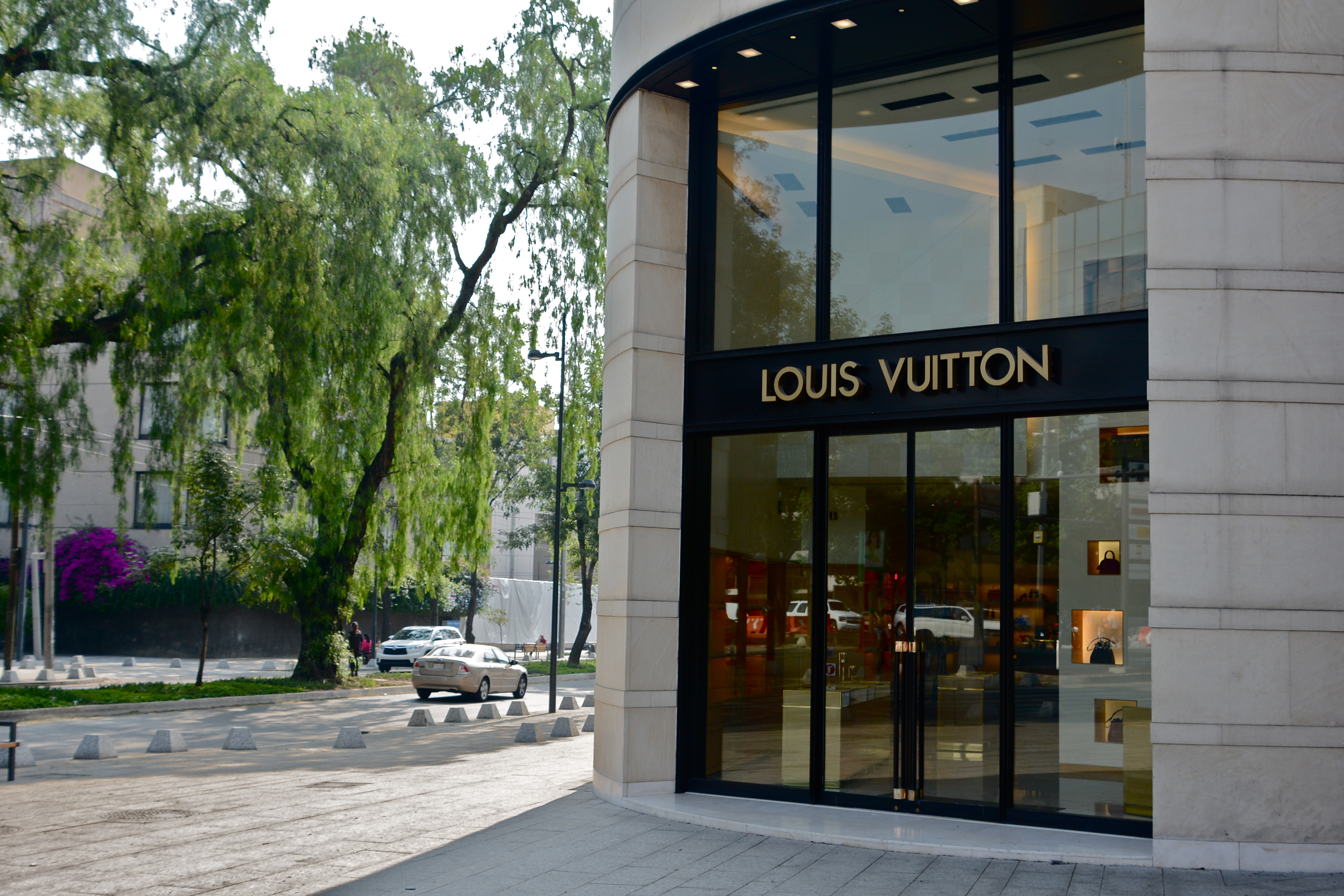
Louis Vuitton boutique on Avenida Masaryk

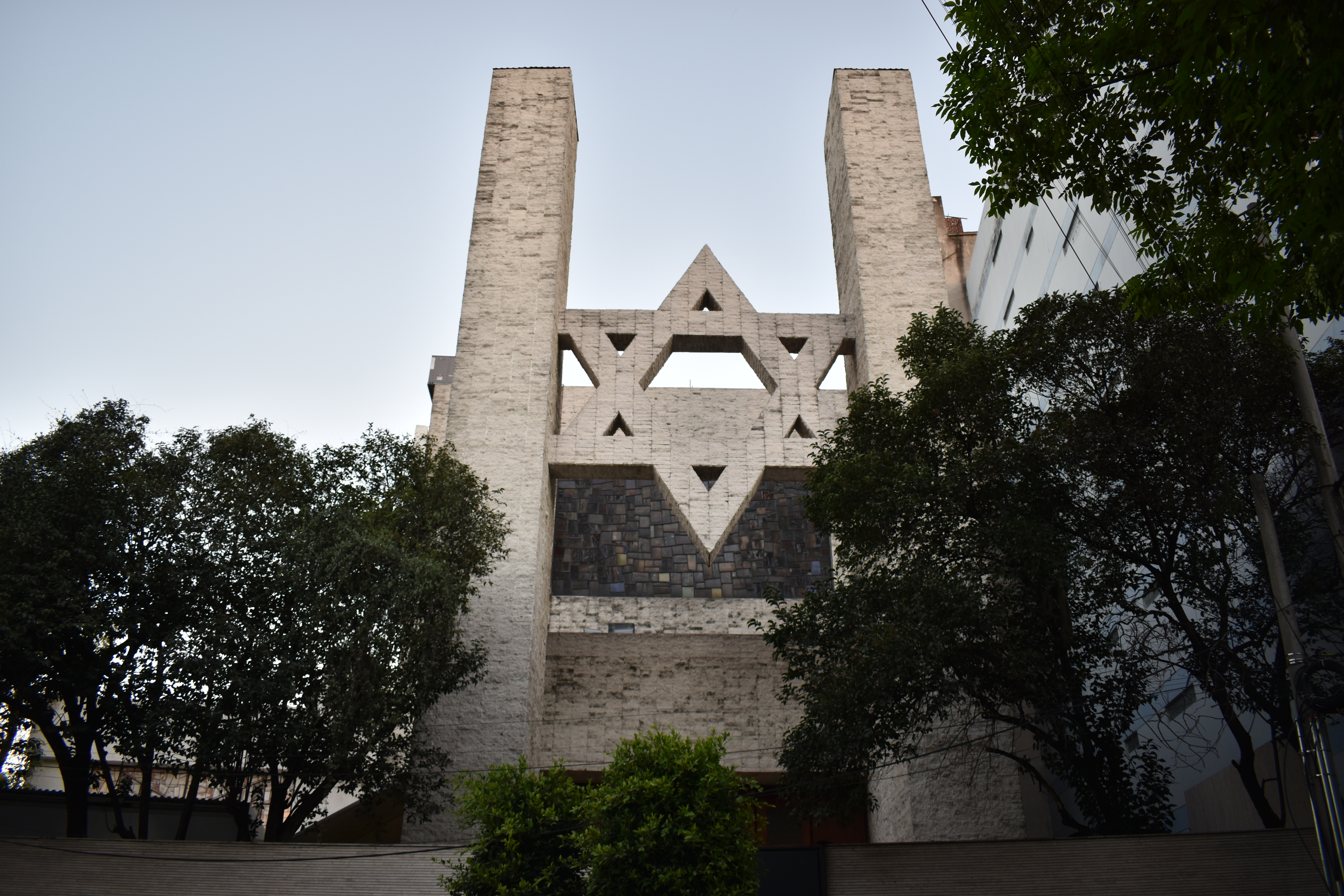
Maguén David Synagogue

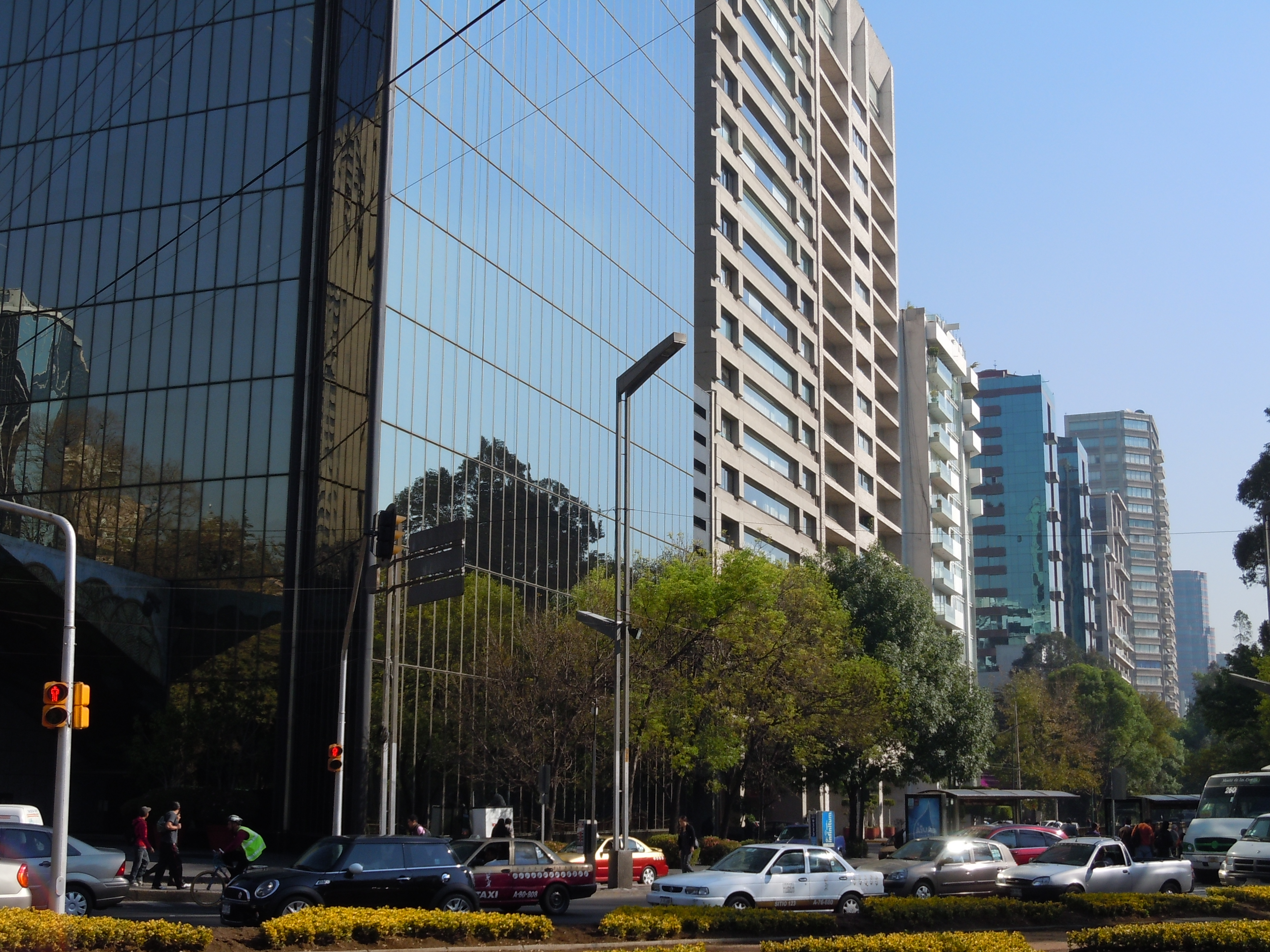
High rise buildings in Polanco

== See also ==
- Nuevo Polanco
- Lomas de Chapultepec
- List of most expensive streets by city
- List of leading shopping streets and districts by city
