= Shopping court =

Type of neighborhood shopping center

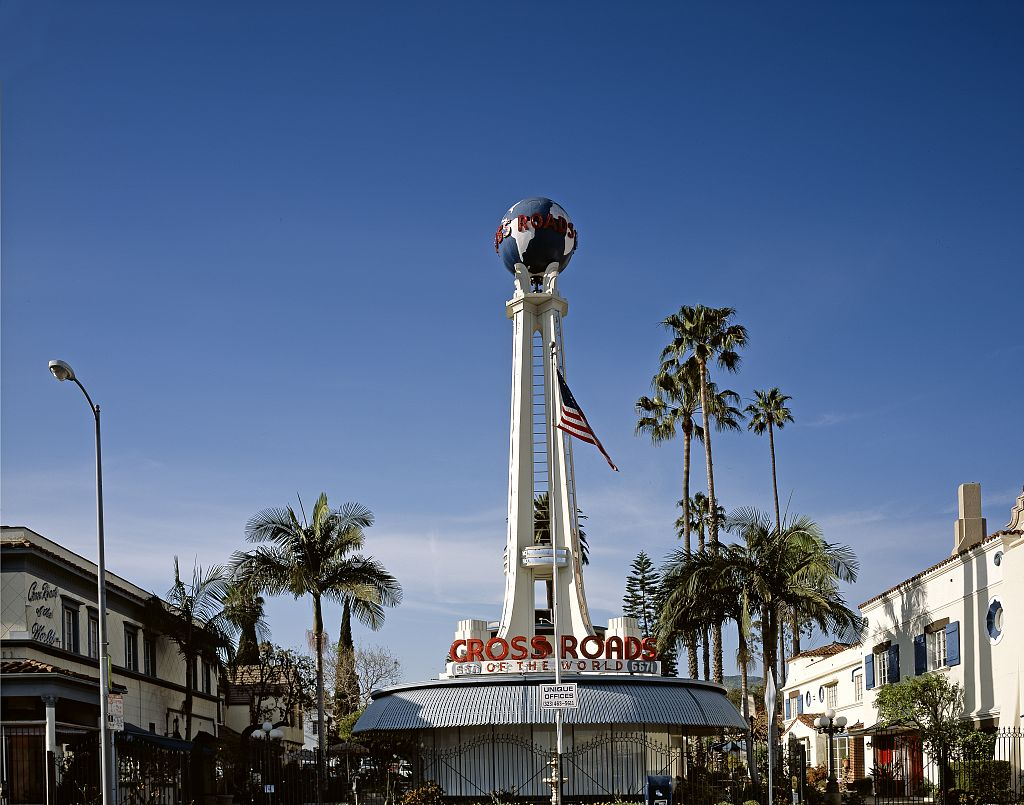
Crossroads of the World, a shopping court in Hollywood, Los Angeles, opened in 1936

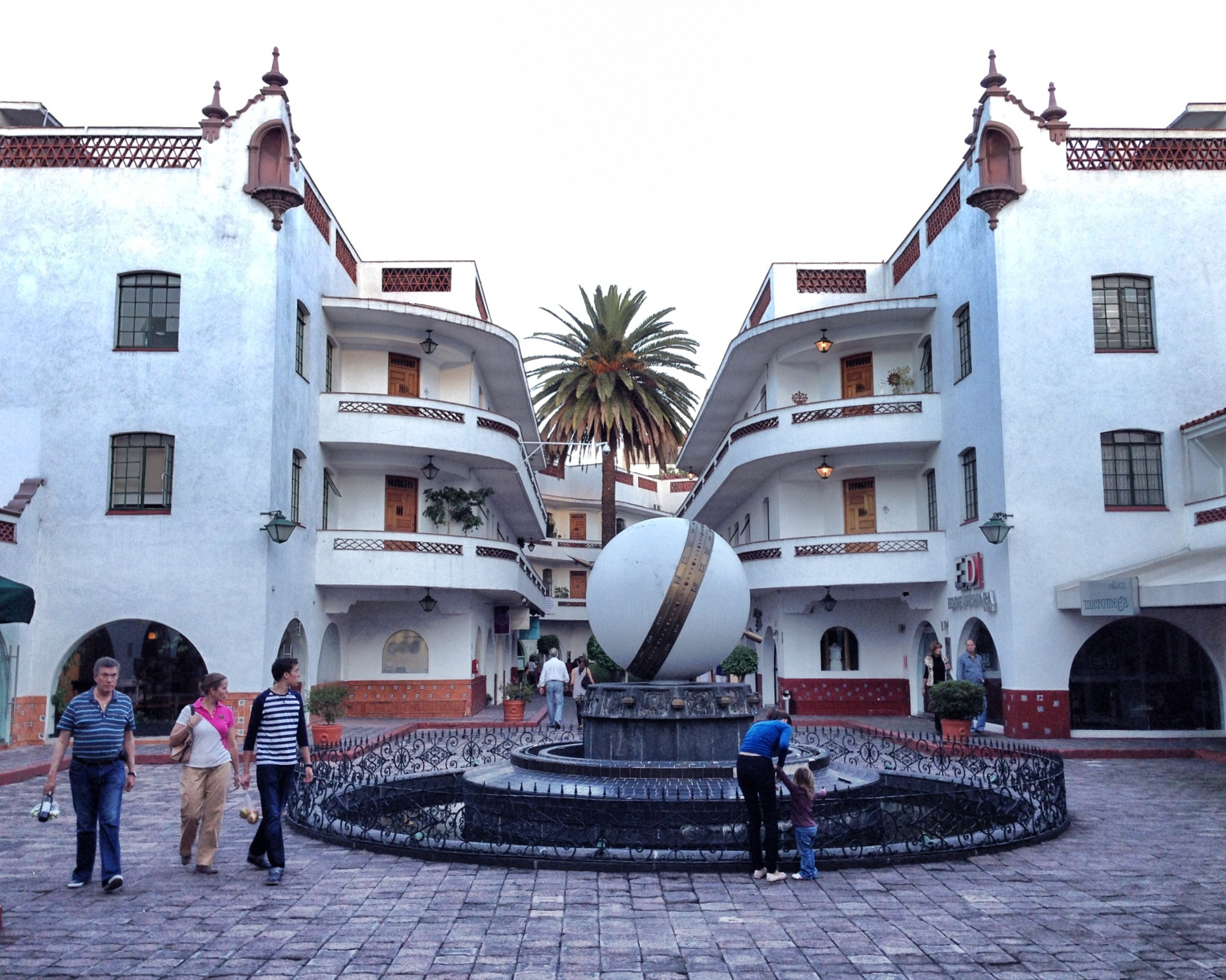
Pasaje Polanco along Avenida Presidente Masaryk in Mexico City, built in 1938 in Colonial Californiano style, a Mexican style derived from California's Spanish Colonial Revival style. Shops face an interior courtyard as well as the street, and there are apartments on two upper floors.

A shopping court is a type of neighborhood shopping center that developed, particularly in Greater Los Angeles, in the 1920s. Most had a few boutiques, themed shops (as today in a festival marketplace), and cafes, up to a dozen and sometimes included offices and studios. A linear walkway or patio connected the units, which was relatively new, as up to then, collections of shops under a management or coordination were connected by a public sidewalk, as in Westwood Village or Country Club Plaza. Patios of buildings in Mexico, Latin America and the Mediterranean inspired the design on the shopping court, as those regions also inspired much of the Southern California architecture during that era, e.g. Spanish Colonial Revival architecture. Shopping courts proliferated in the 1930s in affluent residential areas such as Hollywood, Beverly Hills, and Pasadena, and in resorts like Palm Springs and Santa Barbara. They were limited in impact as the scale could not accommodate larger stores and store windows did not draw attention of passing motorists.

== Examples ==
- Carmel-by-the-Sea – Carmel Plaza
- Carthay Circle – Carthay Center (planned, mostly unbuilt
- Downtown Los Angeles – Olvera Street (in form a pedestrian mall, but the selection of shops, restaurants and stands were selected as for a themed shopping court)
- Fairfax District –
  - Farmers Market (not a true farmer's market)
  - Town & Country Market
- Hollywood – Crossroads of the World
- Southwest Los Angeles – Producer's Public Market
- Santa Barbara – El Paseo
- Ventura – La Floreira

In Mexico:

- Pasaje Polanco in Mexico City, 1938; Colonial californiano style
