= Statue of Martin Luther King Jr. (Mexico City) =

Statue in Mexico City, Mexico

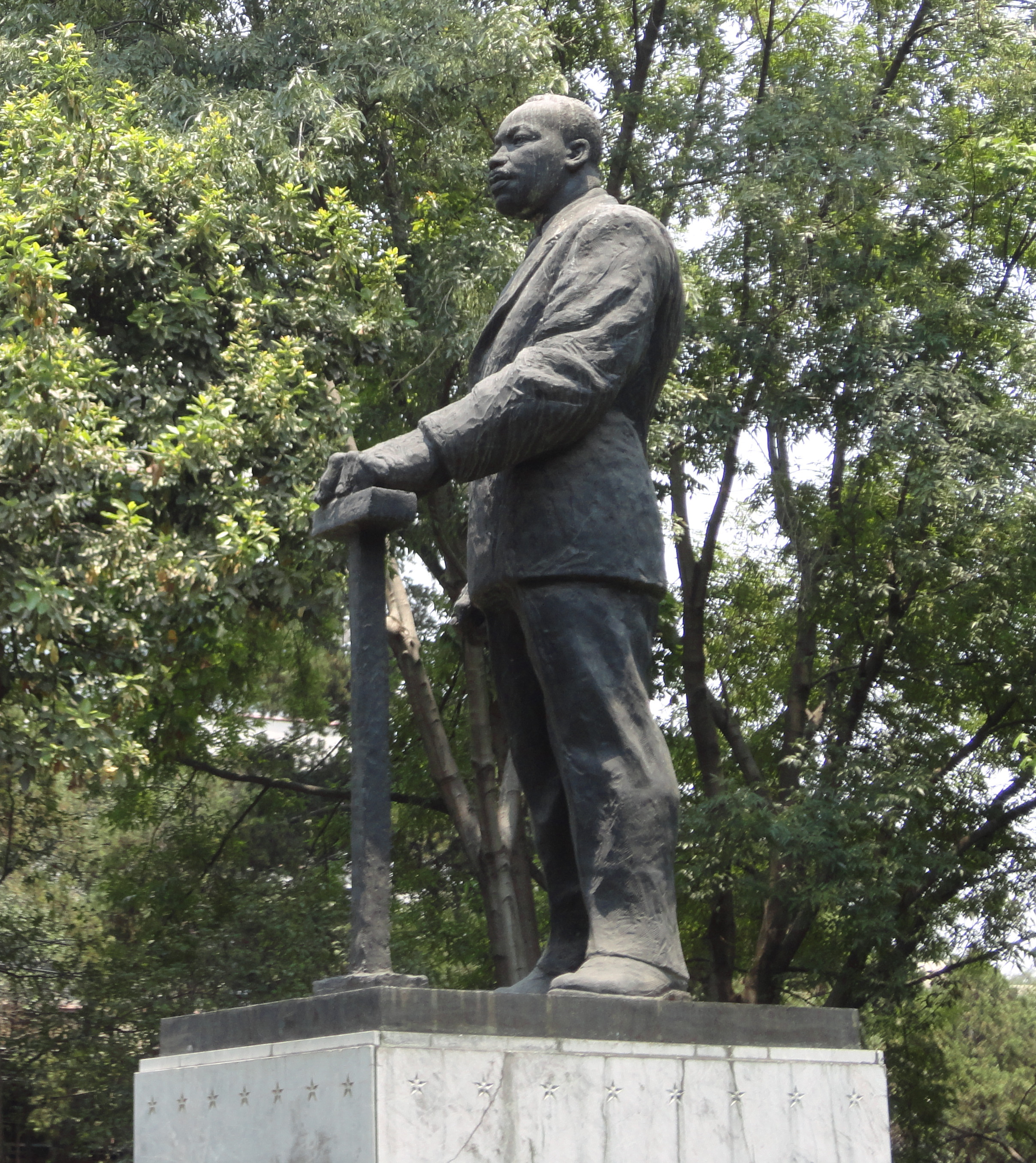
- The statue in 2013
- Artist: Maru Santos
- Year: 1993
- Subject: Martin Luther King Jr.
- Location: Mexico City, Mexico; 19°25′46.3″N 99°11′48.6″W

The statue of Martin Luther King Jr. was installed in Mexico City's Parque Lincoln in 1993 by artist Maru Santos.

== See also ==
- Civil rights movement in popular culture
- Memorials to Martin Luther King Jr.
