= Avenida Río San Joaquín =

Highway in Mexico City

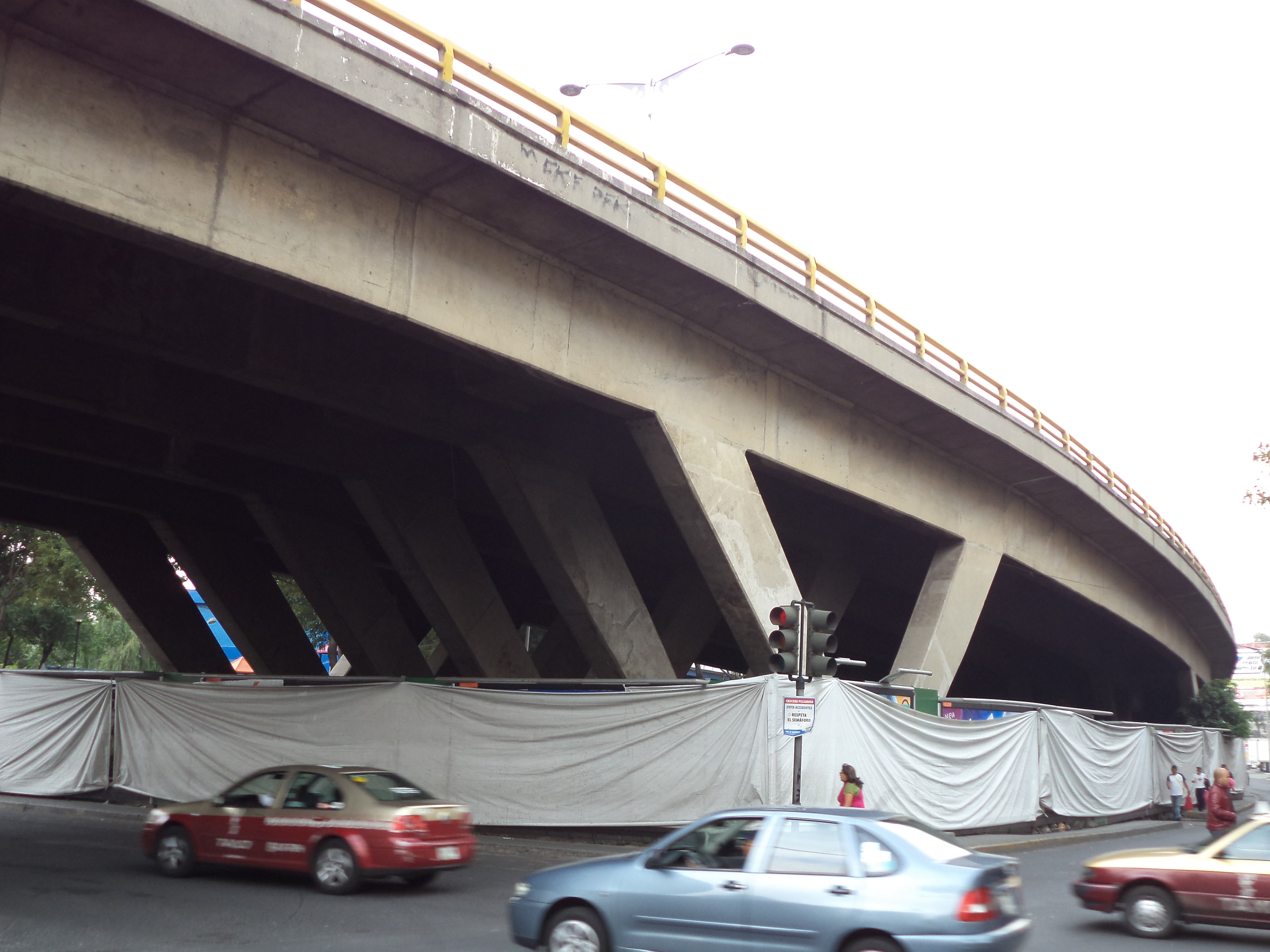
Overpass of the Avenida Río San Joaquín

Avenida Río San Joaquín is an elevated freeway in Mexico City extending from the Anillo Periférico beltway just outside Mexico City in Naucalpan, State of Mexico, in the west, to Avenida General Mariano Escobedo, in the east, at the juncture of the Polanco, Nuevo Polanco (Colonia Granada), and Anzures areas, continuing eastwards as Avenida Ejercito Nacional towards the Circuito Interior.

In August 2010 two lanes were made reversible, used for commuters from the State of Mexico into Mexico City from 6:30 to 10:00 A.M. Monday to Friday.

From September 2010 through January 2012, 2,240,000 vehicles used the freeway, according to government sources, with approximately 6500 motorists per day using the reversible lanes.
