= Au Pied de Cochon (Mexico City) =

French restaurant in Mexico City

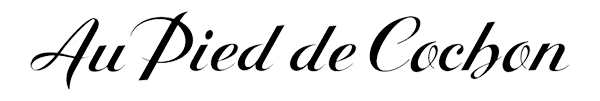
- Interactive map of Au Pied de Cochon

Restaurant information
- Established: 2000
- Head chef: Frédéric Lobjois
- Food type: French
- Location: Campos Elíseos 218, Polanco, Miguel Hidalgo, Mexico City, 11560, Mexico
- Coordinates: 19°25′37.7″N 99°11′37.3″W
- Other information: Nearest station: Auditorio metro station
- Website: aupieddecochon.com.mx

Au Pied de Cochon (French pronunciation: [o pje də kɔʃɔ̃]) is a French brasserie restaurant in Polanco, Mexico City, Mexico. The restaurant is found inside the InterContinental Presidente Mexico City Hotel, and was opened in 2000, as a franchise of the restaurant of the same name in Les Halles, Paris, replicating its style.

== Description ==
Au Pied de Cochon (French for 'At the Pig's Foot') is a French restaurant that offers à la carte options. A brasserie, it serves dishes based on pig, shrimp, fish, meat, and escargots.

The restaurant's interior was inspired by the style of the restaurant Au Pied de Cochon, founded in 1947 in Les Halles, Paris, France. The Art Nouveau interior decoration was recreated, including its upholstery, altarpieces, and chandeliers.

== History ==
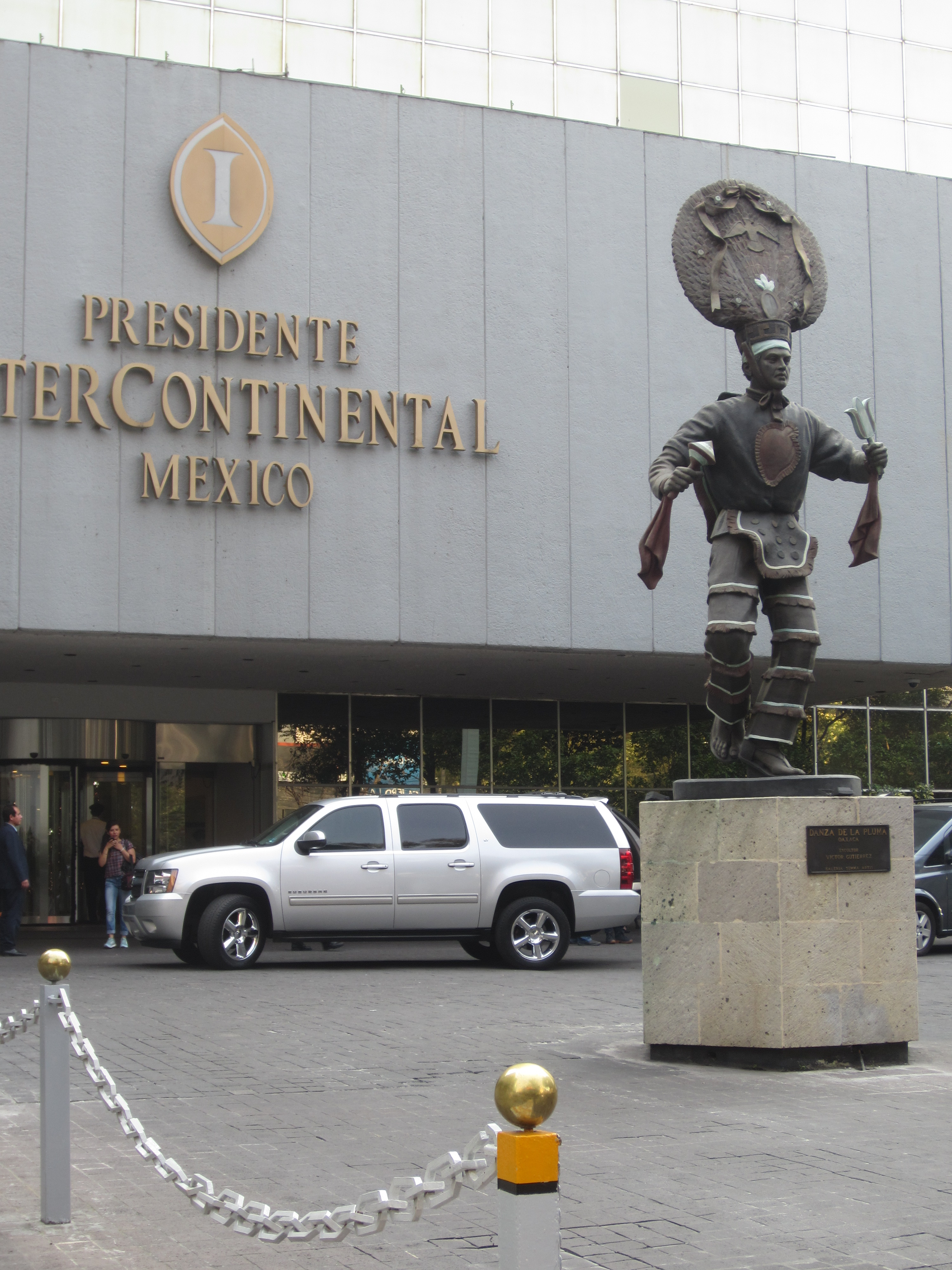
Au Pied de Cochon is found inside the Presidente InterContinental Hotel.

Au Pied de Cochon was opened in 2000, inside the InterContinental Presidente Mexico City Hotel. It functions as an international franchise of the Paris restaurant. Guy Santoro became its first chef. In 2015, Group Bertrand acquired the brand. The head chef has been Frédéric Lobjois since the 2010s.

== Reception ==
The American Automobile Association gave Au Pied de Cochon a positive review, highlighting the seafood and decor, and graded it with four out of diamonds. Similarly, Time Out graded it with four out of five stars, praising the same elements. Guillaume Guevara of The Infatuation recommended the restaurant after visiting landmarks in the nearby Chapultepec park.
