= Town & Country Market =

Former shopping mall in Los Angeles

Coordinates: 34.0703°N 118.3603°W

Town & Country Market was a shopping center in the Fairfax District of Los Angeles, at the southeast corner of Third and Fairfax, across Third from Farmer's Market. it incorporated elements of a farmer's market but profiled itself as a "small town of 100 smart shops". Opened in 1942, author Richard Longstreth, who calls it an example of the "shopping court", notes that it was one of the first shopping centers in Los Angeles built with parking lots for customers arriving by car, being much larger than the earlier Broadway & 87th Street shopping center and preceding the larger Broadway-Crenshaw Center (opened 1946) by 5 years. It was more regular in plan and more pretentious in appearance than Farmer's market across the street. It promoted its entertainment and had 26 restaurants onsite, in this sense a precursor to the lifestyle center of today. The market opened on May 14, 1942.

The site continues as a community shopping center signed Town & Country Center. The anchors are:

- 6360 building: CVS Pharmacy, formerly Sav-on Drug Store
- 6350 building: Whole Foods Market (formerly a Ralphs, and before that, a Safeway)
- 6310 building: former Kmart (demolished 2023), originally Britts Department Store

As of 2023, it is being redeveloped by Regency Centers as Bloom on Third, with a new mixed-use complex under construction on the site of the demolished Kmart. It will have apartments on the upper floors, and the Whole Foods Market will move into the lower levels when it is completed.
