= Avenida Presidente Masaryk =

Street in Mexico City

Coordinates: 19.4316°N 99.1966°W

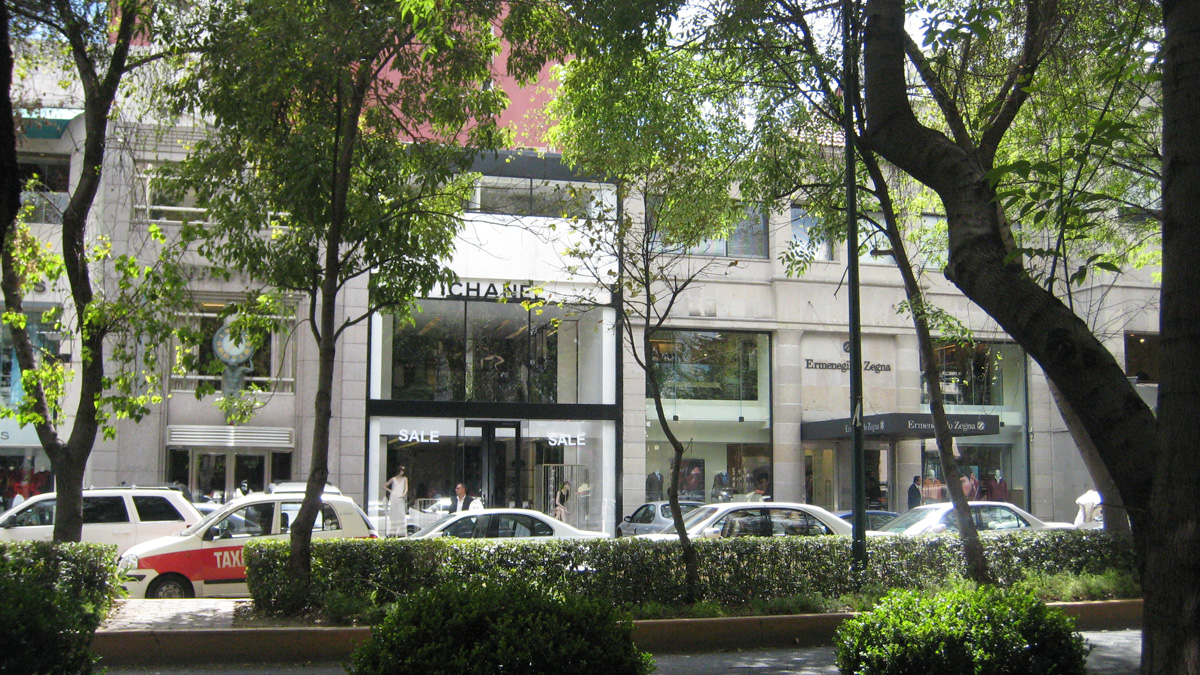
- Interactive map of Avenida Presidente Masaryk
- Namesake: Tomáš Masaryk
- Location: Polanco, Miguel Hidalgo; Mexico City, Mexico
- Nearest metro station: Polanco
- East: Calzada General Mariano Escobedo
- West: Avenida Ferrocarril de Cuernavaca

Avenida Presidente Masaryk is a thoroughfare in the affluent Polanco neighborhood of Mexico City. It stretches from Calzada General Mariano Escobedo in the east to Avenida Ferrocarril de Cuernavaca in the west, passing along the north side of the Polanquito restaurant district that borders Parque Lincoln. Masaryk is one of the most expensive shopping districts in the world and competes with Avenida Madero in the Historic Center for the title of street with the highest rents in the city.

== History ==
President Lázaro Cárdenas named the avenue after Tomáš Garrigue Masaryk, the first President of Czechoslovakia, in 1936.

In 1999 the city of Prague donated a statue of Masaryk to Mexico City, one of the two originals made when the statue for the Prague Castle was being prepared for the 150th anniversary of his birth. The statue was placed in the roundabout at the intersection of Av. Presidente Masaryk and Arquímedes on 28 October 2000, on the Czechoslovak National Day.

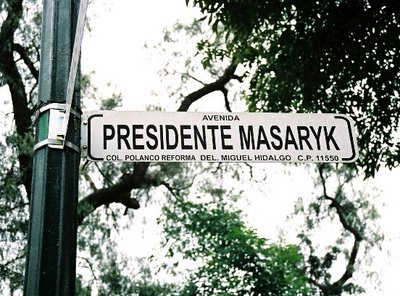
Avenida Presidente Masaryk street sign

The name of the street is often misspelled e.g. "Mazarik" or "Mazaryk". The City of Mexico decided to correct the signs under its control in 2000 (street, highway and other signs), but the incorrect names remained on some of the local shops.

=== Renovation 2013–2015 ===
In 2013 Seduvi, the Ministry of Urban Development and Housing of the Federal District, decided to invest 480 million pesos for the urban renewal of the street, with an emphasis on making it more walkable. Half of this budget will be contributed by the government, with the rest coming from the private sector and a tax being levied on the residents and businesses who will benefit from the rehabilitation.

The project was a complete overhaul of infrastructure, it included: granite sidewalks, hydraulic concrete, landscaping (including the replacement of unhealthy trees), new benches and bike racks, energy efficient light posts, replacement of aging water supply and drainage systems, and the replacement of overhead electricity/telephone cables with an underground system. The rehabilitation, which was completed in phases, started in January 2014 and was expected to last 18 months. The avenue was officially reinaugurated on 8 and 9 August 2015 with a cultural event that included a performance by Kalimba, a marathon and group yoga, among other activities.

Masaryk faces competition from luxury shopping centers in the far west of the city such as Centro Santa Fe, Arcos Lomas and Paseo Interlomas.

== Points of interest ==
Avenida Masaryk hosts many boutiques of international brands including Abercrombie & Fitch, Adidas, Audi, BMW, Cartier, Chopard, Creed, Dolce & Gabbana, Fendi, Gucci, Hermès, Hugo Boss, Lexus, Louis Vuitton, MaxMara, Massimo Dutti, Montblanc, The North Face, Salvatore Ferragamo, Starbucks, Sunglass Hut, Tiffany & Co, Timberland, Volvo, Zara, and Zegna.

Pasaje Polanco, a smaller but historic collection of shops around a courtyard, was built in the 1930s in Colonial Californiano style, which is the Mexican interpretation of California Spanish Colonial Revival architecture. The National Conservatory of Music is at the far west end of the street.
