= Statue of José Gervasio Artigas, Mexico City =

Statue in Mexico City, Mexico

Statue of José Gervasio Artigas
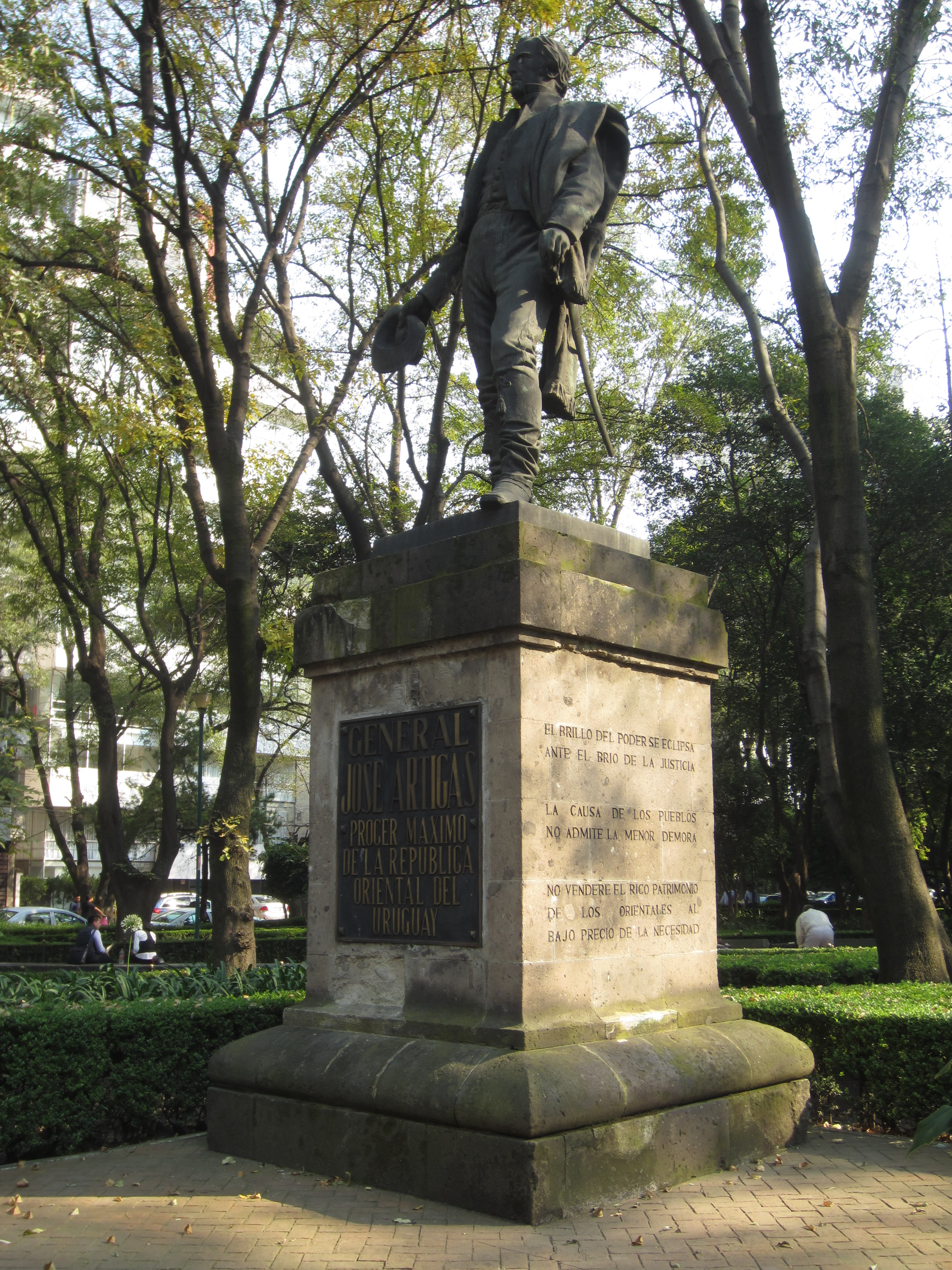
- The statue in 2018
- Subject: José Gervasio Artigas
- Location: Mexico City, Mexico; 19°25′59.4″N 99°11′15.4″W

The statue of José Gervasio Artigas is installed in Mexico City's Plaza Uruguay, in Mexico. The sculpture is made of bronze, it was sculpted by Armando González, and was donated by the government of Uruguay.
