= Parque Lincoln =

Park in Mexico City

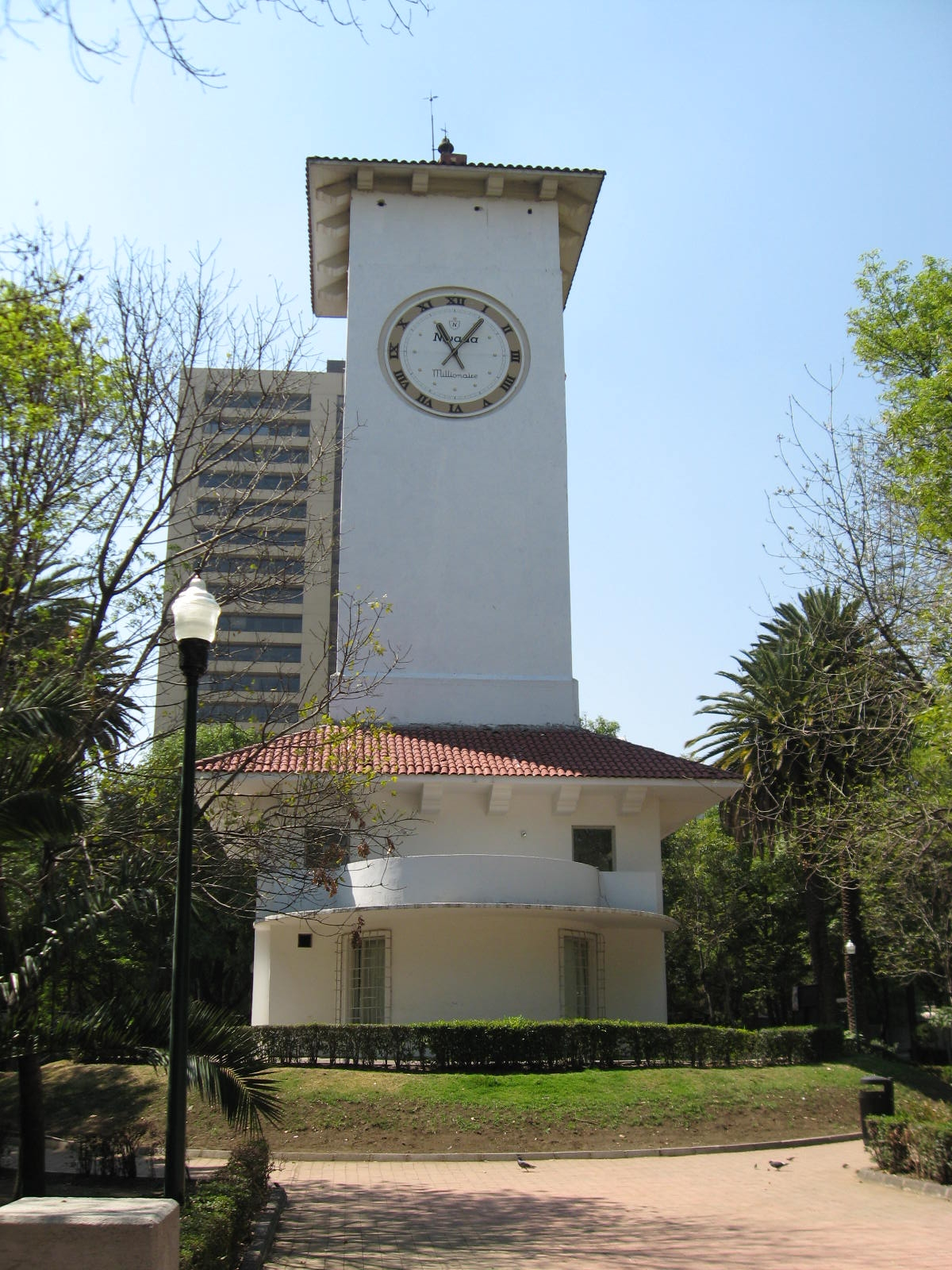
- The clock tower, an icon of Polanco

- Location within Mexico City Location within Mexico
- Type: Urban park
- Location: Polanco, Mexico City, Mexico
- Coordinates: 19°25′47″N 99°11′54″W
- Created: 1938
- Operator: Alcaldía Miguel Hidalgo

Parque Lincoln is a city park in the Polanco neighborhood of Mexico City. It was the first park built for the Polanco colonia when it opened in 1938, and is named after US President Abraham Lincoln, whose statue — a replica of Augustus Saint-Gaudens's Abraham Lincoln: The Man — was donated by the Johnson administration in the mid-1960s. The park also has a statue of Martin Luther King Jr.

Parque Lincoln is bounded by Emilio Castelar to the north and Luis G. Urbina to the south, with Julio Verne crossing through it. Its main features include a clock tower (1937), two reflecting pools, an open-air theater named for soprano Ángela Peralta, and an aviary that once gave the park its earlier nickname, "Parque del Palomar."

== History ==
The land now occupied by Polanco was part of the Hacienda de los Morales, a colonial estate dating to the 16th century. The hacienda lands were subdivided in the 1930s, and the Polanco neighborhood was developed starting in 1937 by the Alemán family. Architect Enrique Aragón Echegaray designed the park's layout and its original structures. President Lázaro Cárdenas inaugurated it in 1938.

Before it was called Parque Lincoln, locals knew it as "Parque de Polanco" or "Parque del Palomar," a reference to the aviary that has been part of the park since its opening.

=== Lincoln statue ===
Lincoln has long been admired in Mexico for his opposition to the Mexican–American War while serving in the U.S. Congress. The statue in the park is a bronze replica of Abraham Lincoln: The Man by Augustus Saint-Gaudens, cast from the same refurbished molds used for the 1887 original in Lincoln Park, Chicago. It was a gift from the United States under President Lyndon B. Johnson. Other casts from the same molds stand in Parliament Square, London, and at the Saint-Gaudens National Historical Park in New Hampshire. The park received its current name on April 15, 1966.

=== Martin Luther King Jr. monument ===
A monument to Martin Luther King Jr. by sculptor Maru Santos was unveiled in September 1993. Coretta Scott King attended the ceremony, though The Baltimore Sun reported that critics connected the tribute to ongoing NAFTA lobbying rather than a commitment to civil rights. Mrs. King was paid $15,000 for her appearance.

== Features ==
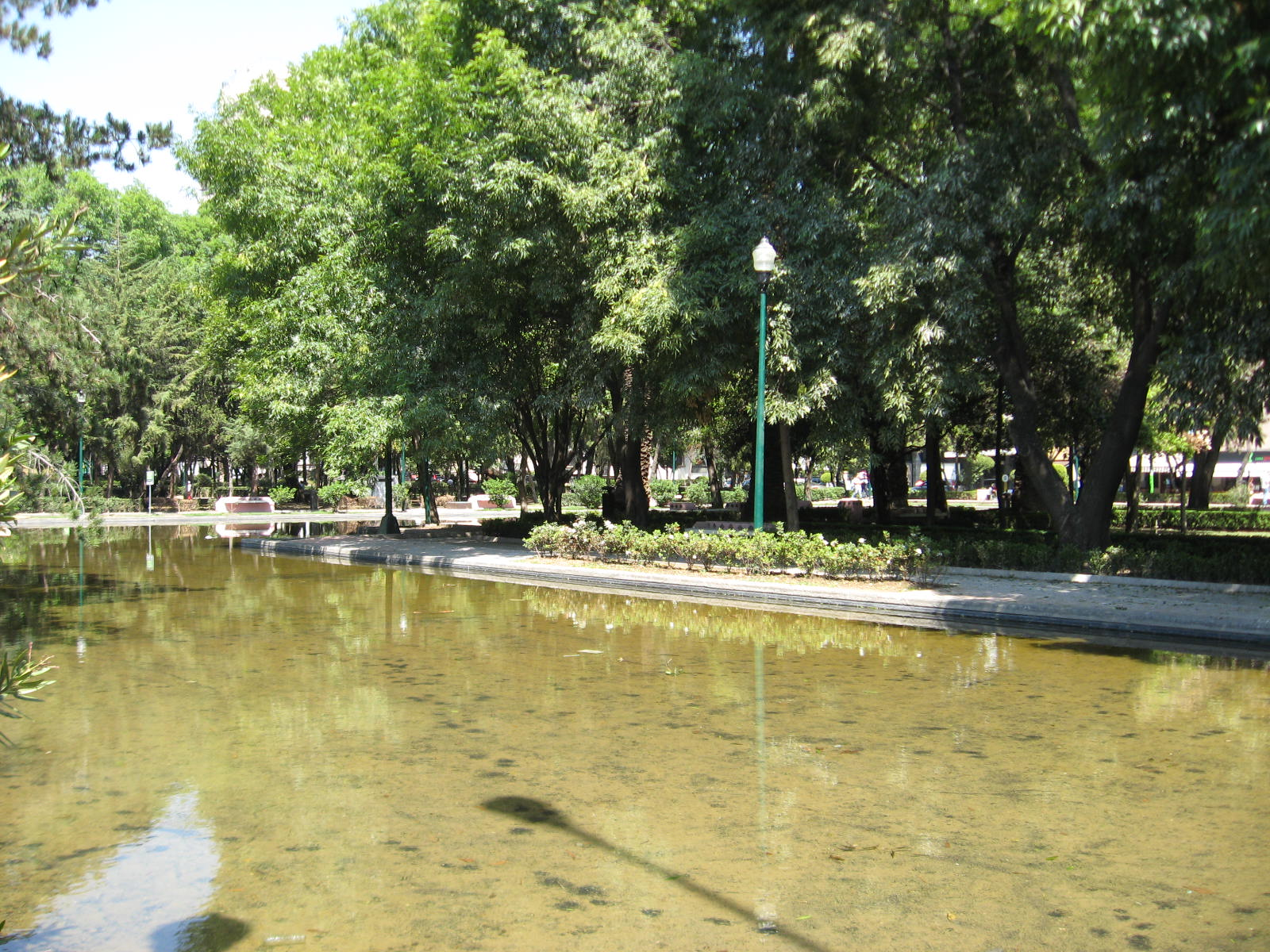
One of two reflecting pools.

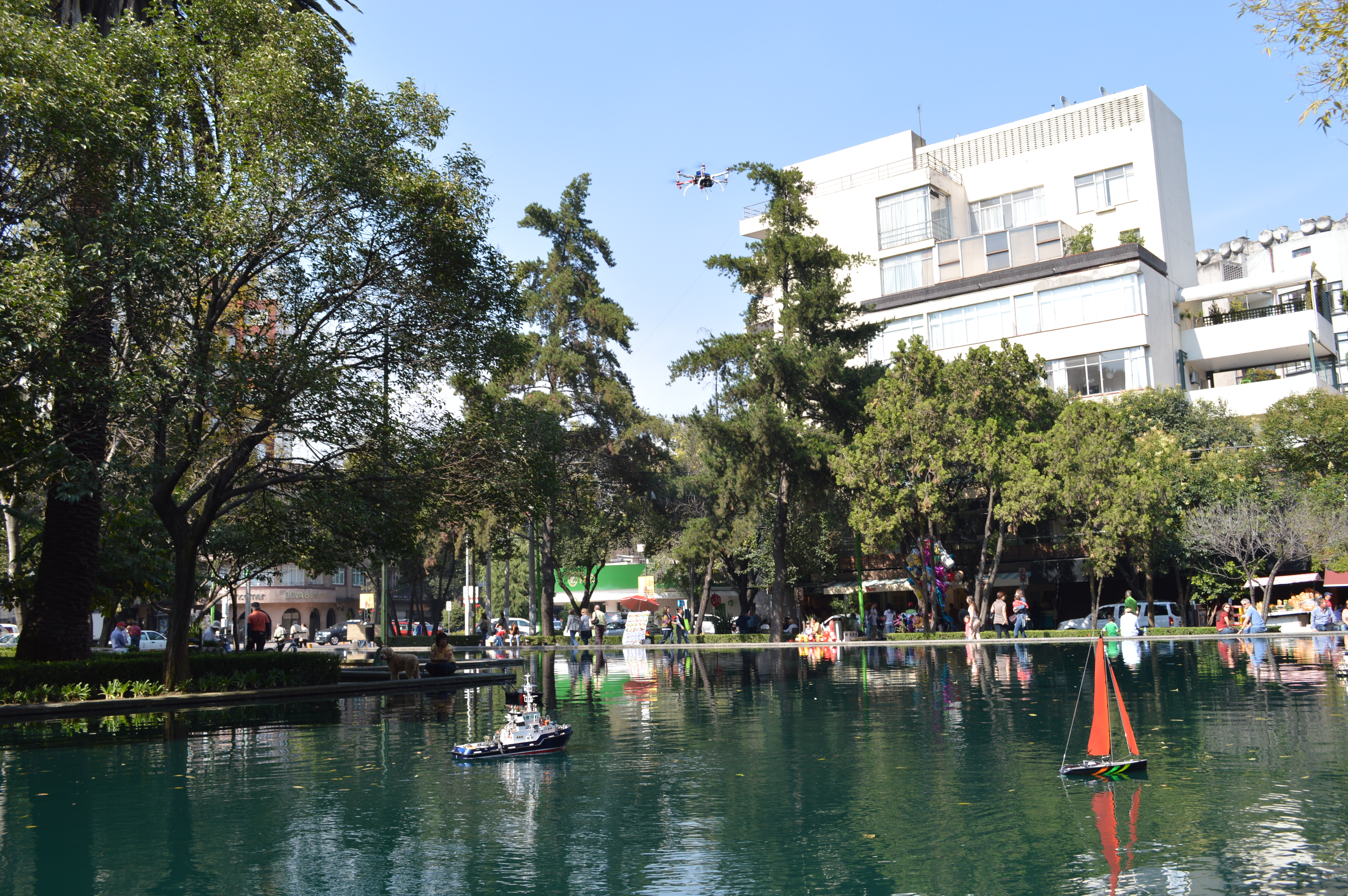
The reflecting pools on a clear day.

The clock tower, built a year before the park opened, became the symbol of Polanco — its silhouette serves as the logo of Metro Polanco station on Line 7. Since 1992 it has housed an art gallery.

The two reflecting pools (espejos de agua) occupy the center of the park. Weekend radio-controlled boat racing on these pools is a tradition going back decades, and they earned the park the nickname "Parque de los Espejos."

The Teatro Ángela Peralta, a small open-air amphitheater built in 1939, is named after Ángela Peralta (1845–1883), a Mexican soprano who debuted at La Scala at seventeen.

A Saturday market (tianguis) operates along the eastern edge of the park, selling produce, meat, and prepared food.

== 1981 renovation ==
In December 1981, Sordo Madaleno Arquitectos drew up plans for a comprehensive renovation at 1:500 scale. Their assessment documented deteriorated walkways and benches, abandoned animal cages, inadequate lighting, and visible damage to the Lincoln statue. The proposal called for converting the disused cages into exhibition space, repairing infrastructure, and restoring the statue.
