= Liverpool (department store) =

Mexican chain of department stores

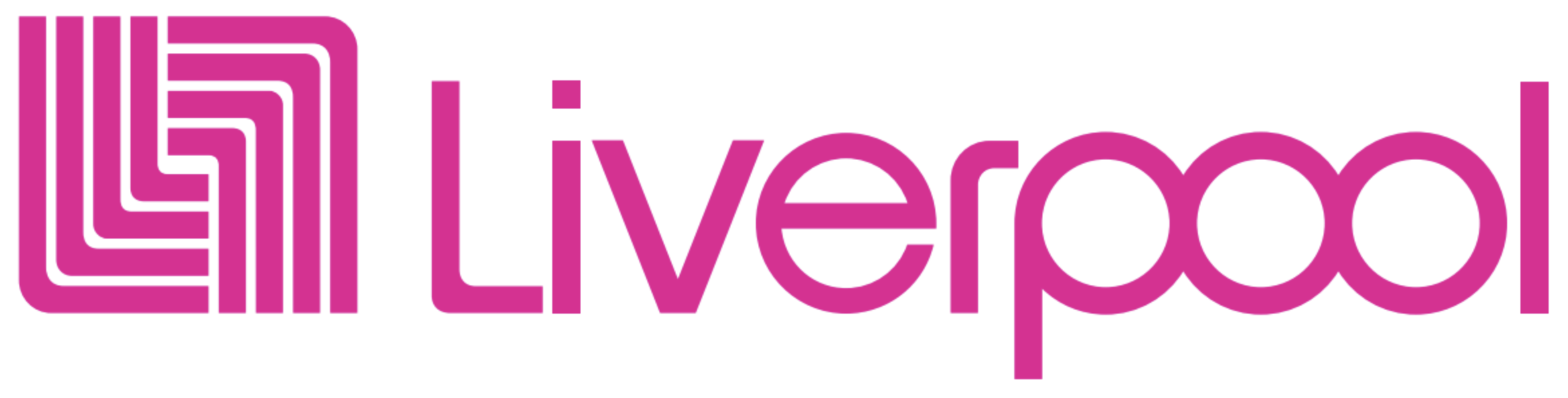

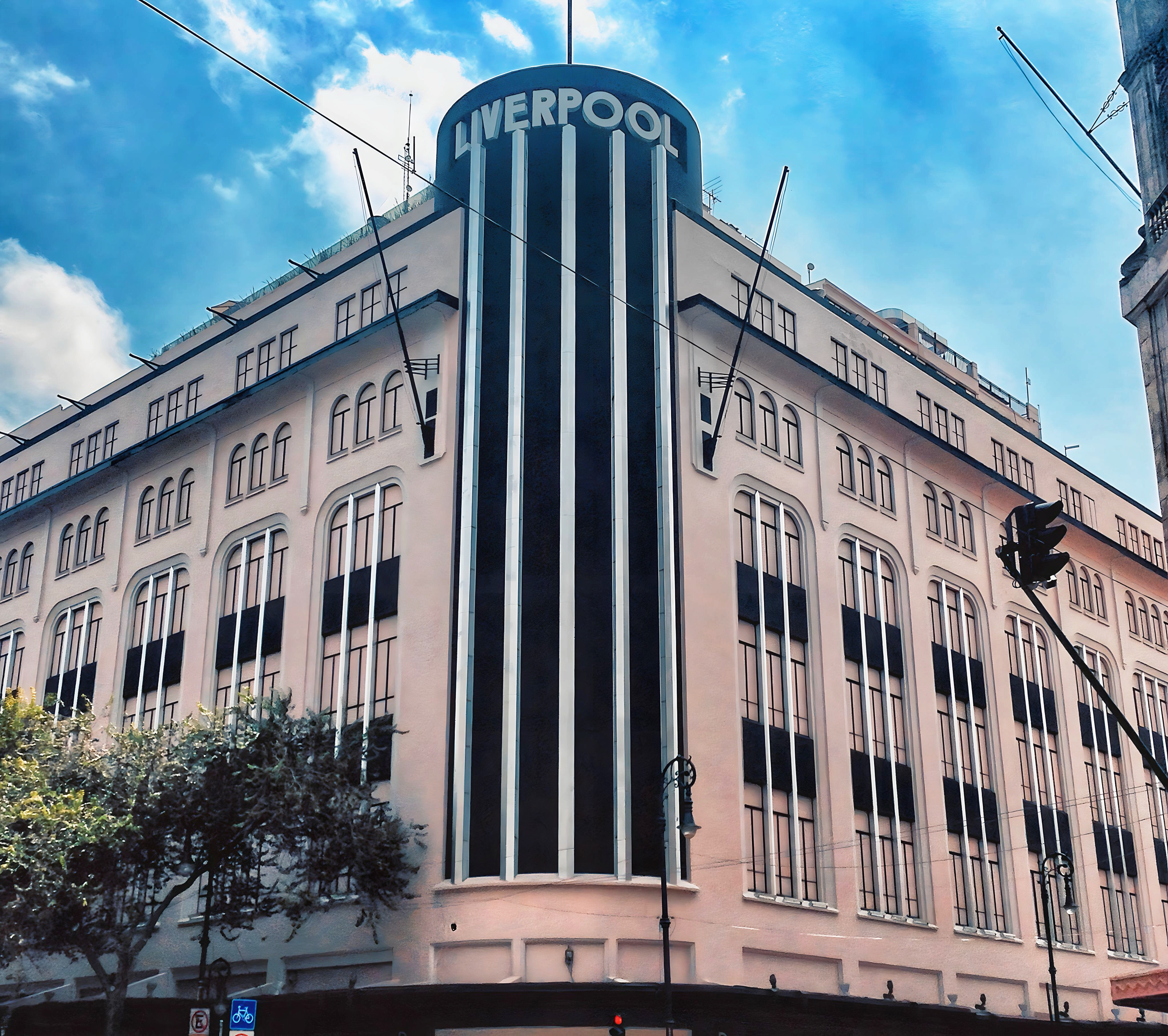
- The original Liverpool store located at Carranza and 20 de Noviembre streets in the historic center of Mexico City.
- Formerly: El Puerto de Liverpool
- Industry: Department stores
- Founded: 1847; 179 years ago
- Founder: Jean Baptiste Ebrard
- Headquarters: Santa Fe, Mexico City, Mexico City, Mexico
- Number of locations: 124 (2022)
- Area served: Mexico
- Key people: Jorge Salgado (Group CEO)
- Products: Clothing and accessories, shoes, perfume, cosmetics, jewelry, home furnishings, tabletop, housewares, appliances, notions and fabrics, books and magazines, candy, sporting goods, specialty foods
- Services: restaurants, food halls, interior design, gift registry, personal shopper, click and collect, drawings and contests, revolving credit for retail customers, insurance, travel agencies
- Parent: El Puerto de Liverpool
- Website: liverpool.com.mx

Liverpool is a Mexican department stores chain founded by Jean Baptiste Ebrard in 1847, one of dozens of so-called "Barcelonnettes" department stores in Mexico founded by immigrants from Barcelonnette and surrounding areas in the French Alps near the Italian border. Now, Liverpool is owned by the holding company El Puerto de Liverpool.

El Puerto de Liverpool is listed on the Mexican Stock Exchange (BMV) under the ticker symbol LIVEPOL. The company also holds a 50% stake in Unicomer, a company that has retail chains in 26 Latin American countries. The Group's headquarters are in Santa Fe, a suburb and a main business center in Mexico City.

El Puerto de Liverpool group also owned another department store chain Fábricas de Francia, and in 2018-19 eliminated the brand, converting 14 stores to the Suburbia format, 23 to Liverpool, and permanently closing 4.

== History ==
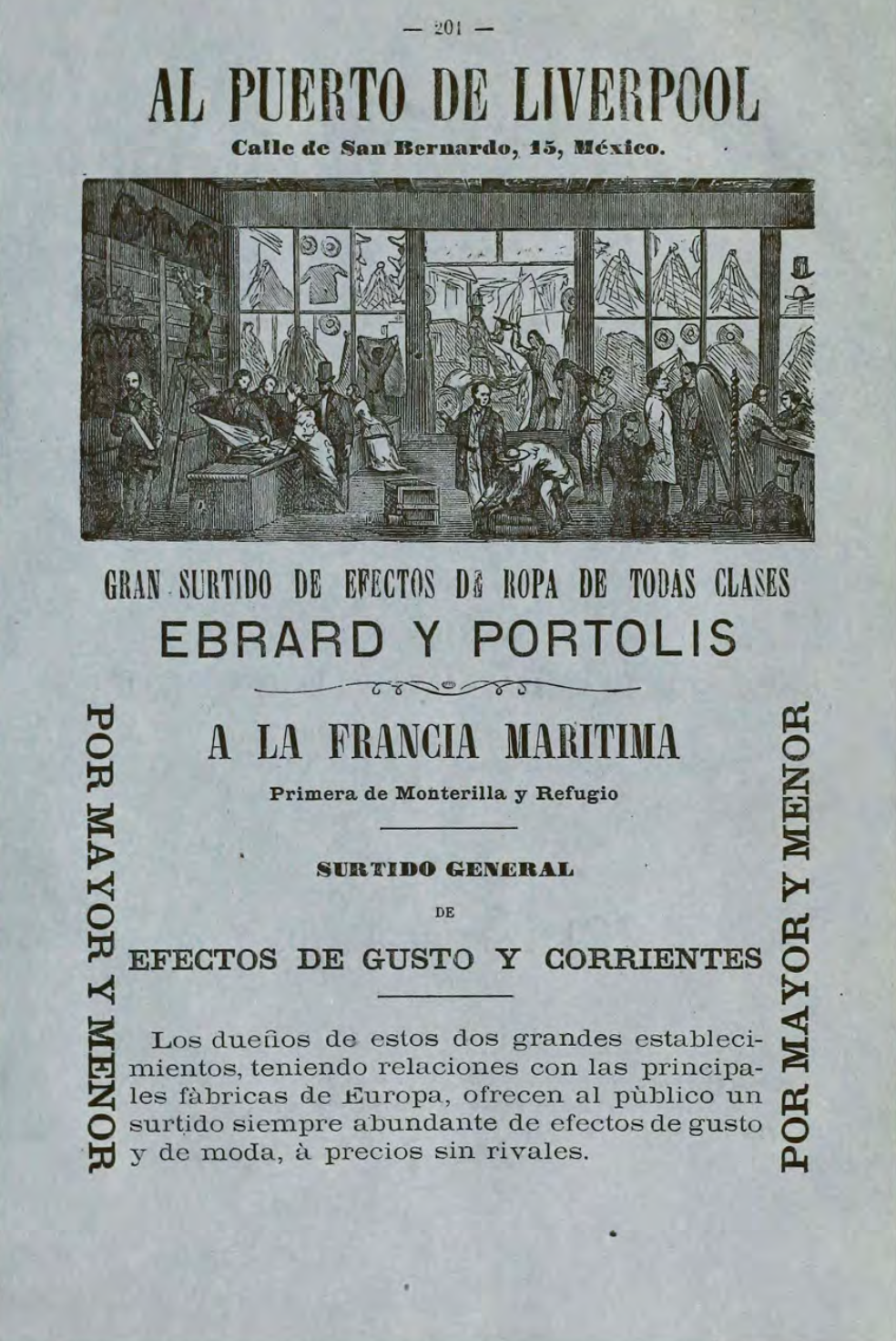
Advertisement in an 1867 almanac

Liverpool, first called The Cloth Case, was founded in 1847 by Jean-Baptiste Ebrard, a Frenchman who first started selling clothes in cases in Downtown Mexico City. In 1872, he started importing merchandise from Europe. Much of the merchandise was shipped via Liverpool, England, prompting Ebrard to adopt the name Liverpool for his store, in 1862 he opened its second store and since then it has continued growing.

=== Growth of the Liverpool chain ===
for history of the group

- In 1936, the new Liverpool Center building was inaugurated on Avenida 20 de Noviembre, designed by architect Enrique de la Mora and the first escalators were installed there.
- 1962, opened its first branch of Liverpool, Liverpool Insurgentes, in then-suburban Colonia Del Valle, 9 km southwest of its downtown Mexico City store.
- 1970: Liverpool opened the Liverpool Polanco, internationally recognized for its beauty and functionality
- 1972: opened Liverpool Satélite, the first Liverpool in a mall, Plaza Satélite
- In 1993, Liverpool Santa Fe was inaugurated with the first ellipse-shaped escalators in Mexico City, in the Centro Santa Fe mall
- 1996: opened Liverpool León
- 2008: together with VISA, launched the Liverpool Premium Card credit card
- 2018-2020: rebrands 24 of the 41 Fábricas de Francia department stores as Liverpool. 14 became Suburbia branches and 3 were permanently closed.

== Gallery: Liverpool Polanco - interior ==
All photos were taken at Liverpool Polanco:

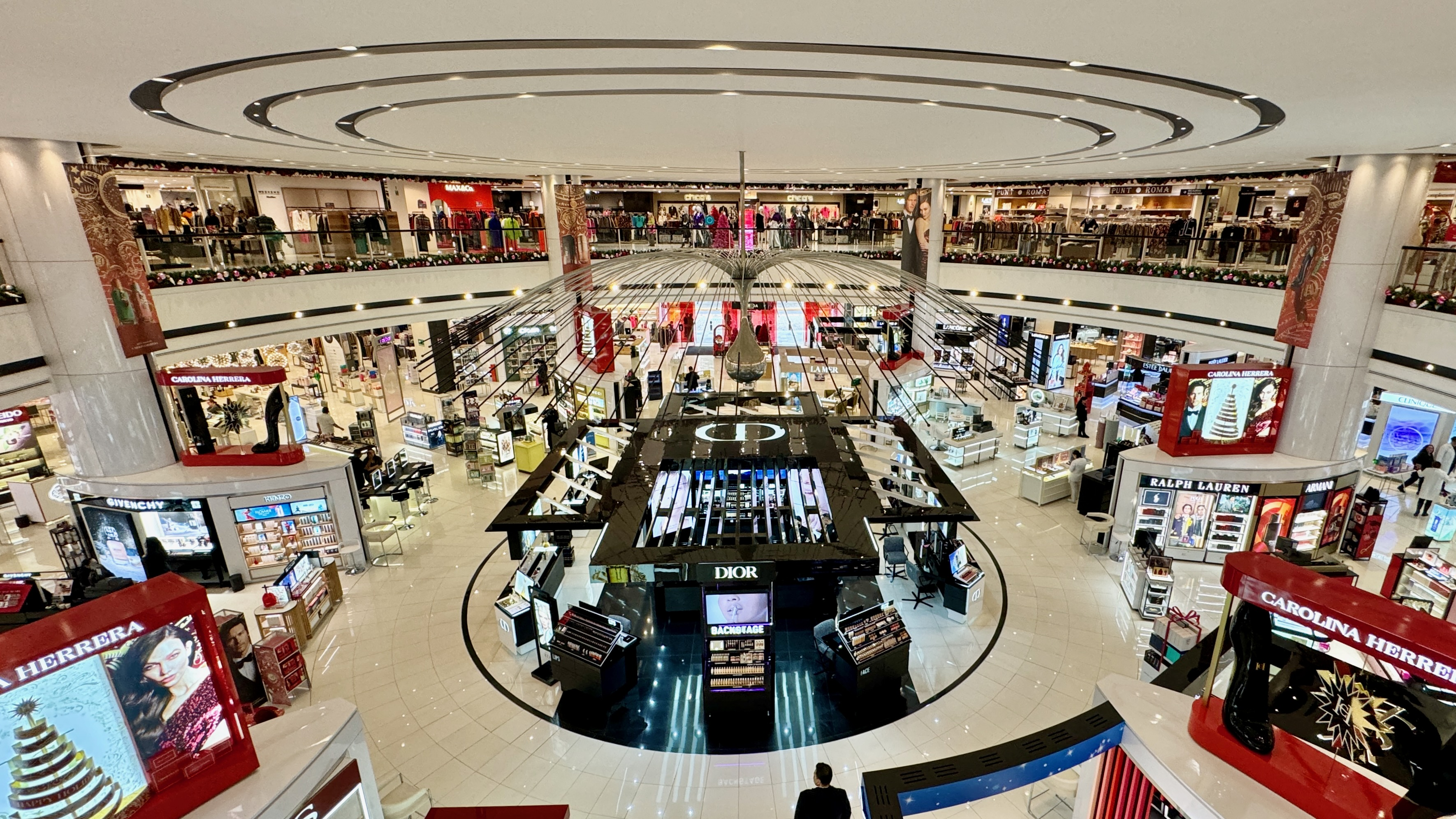
Cosmetics Hall

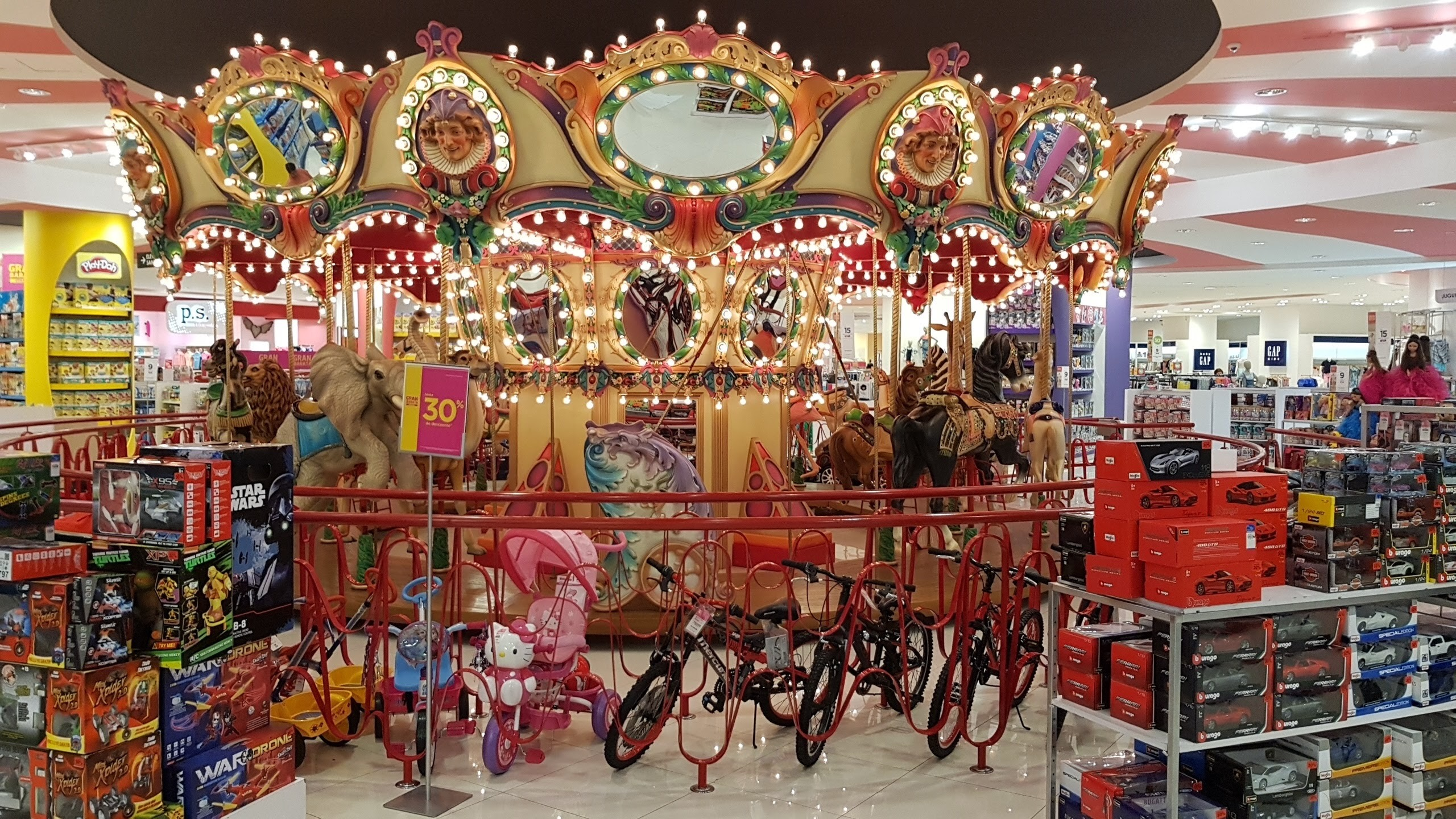
Carousel in the toy dept.

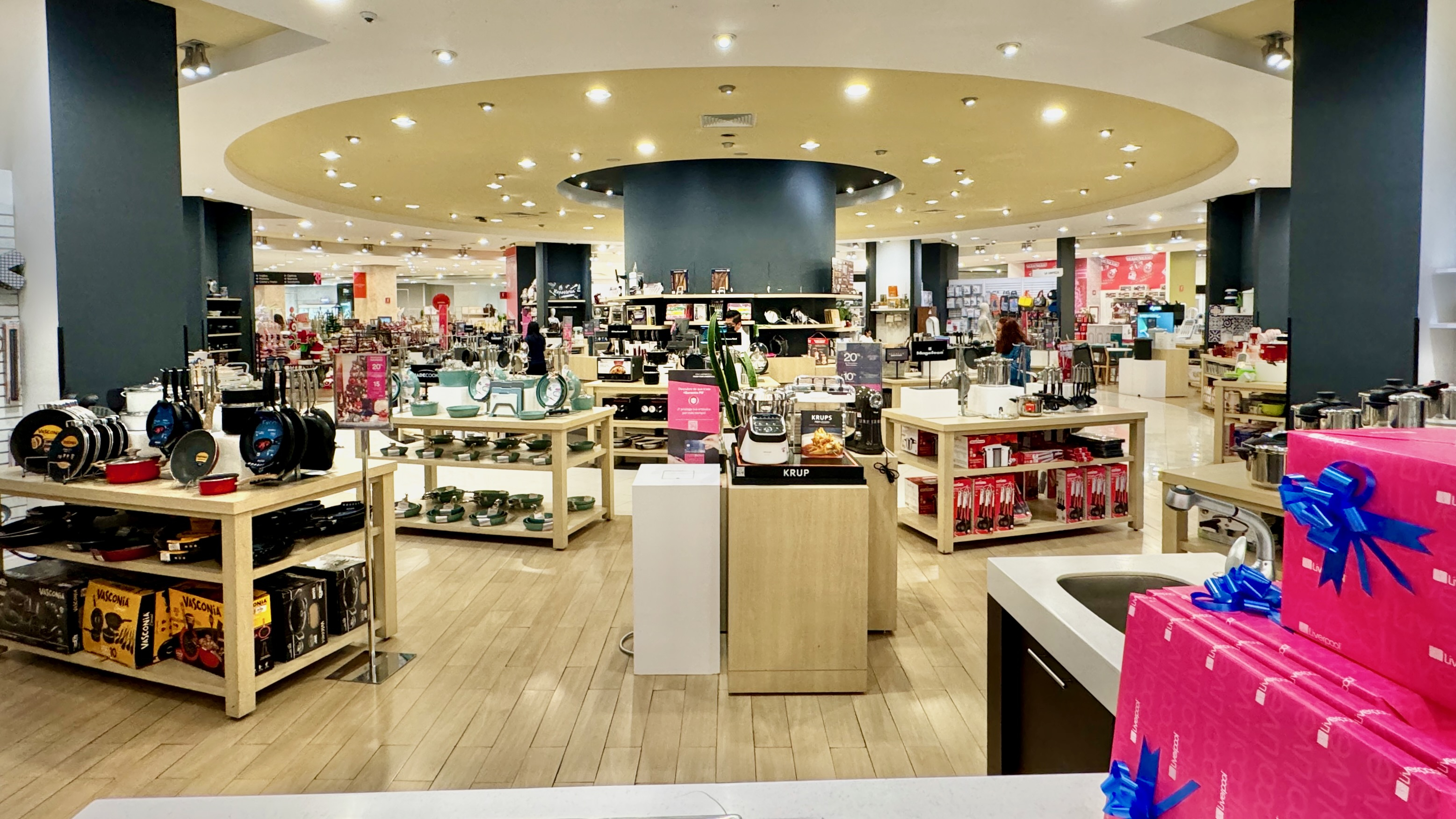
Housewares

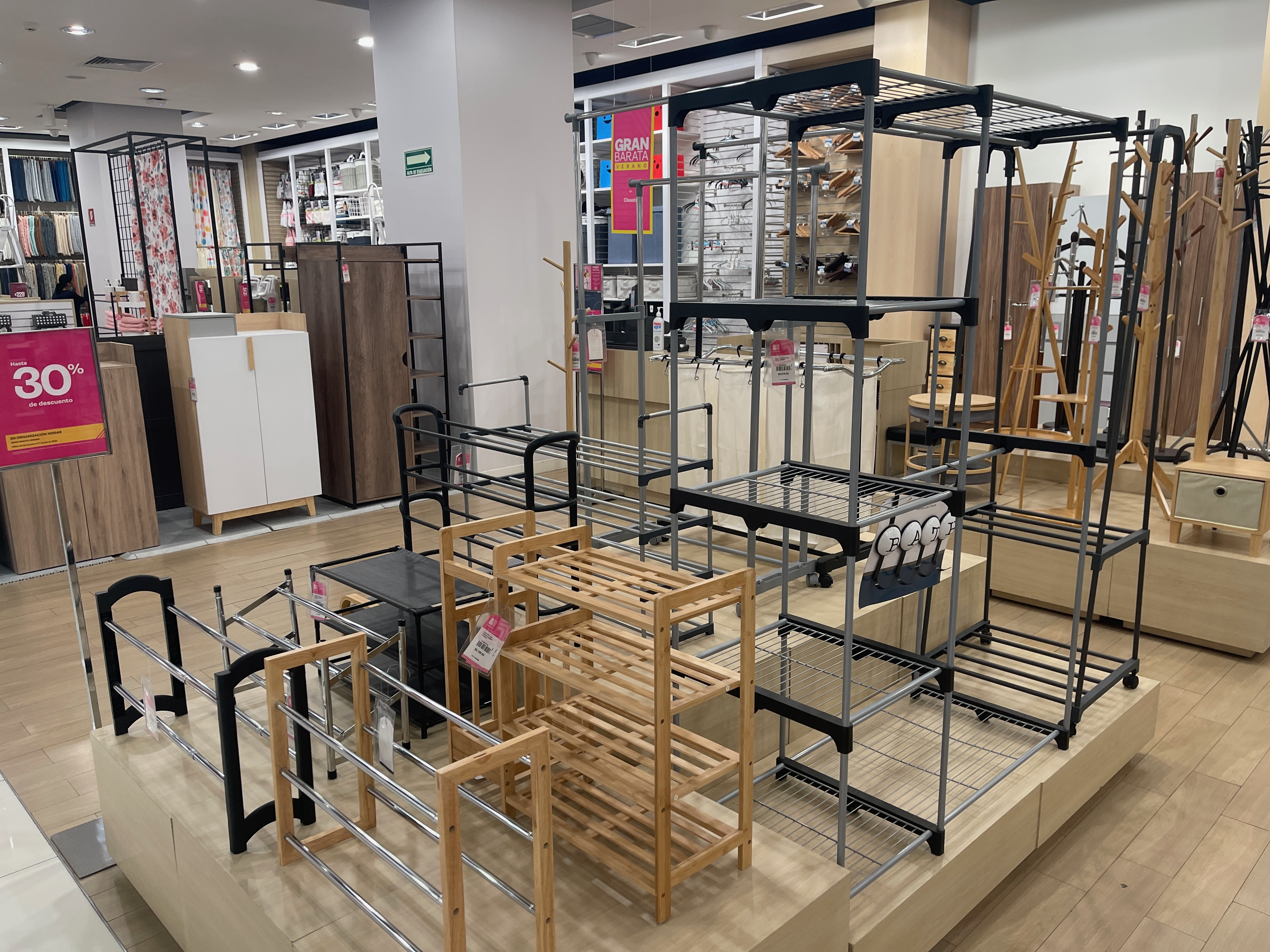
Home organization

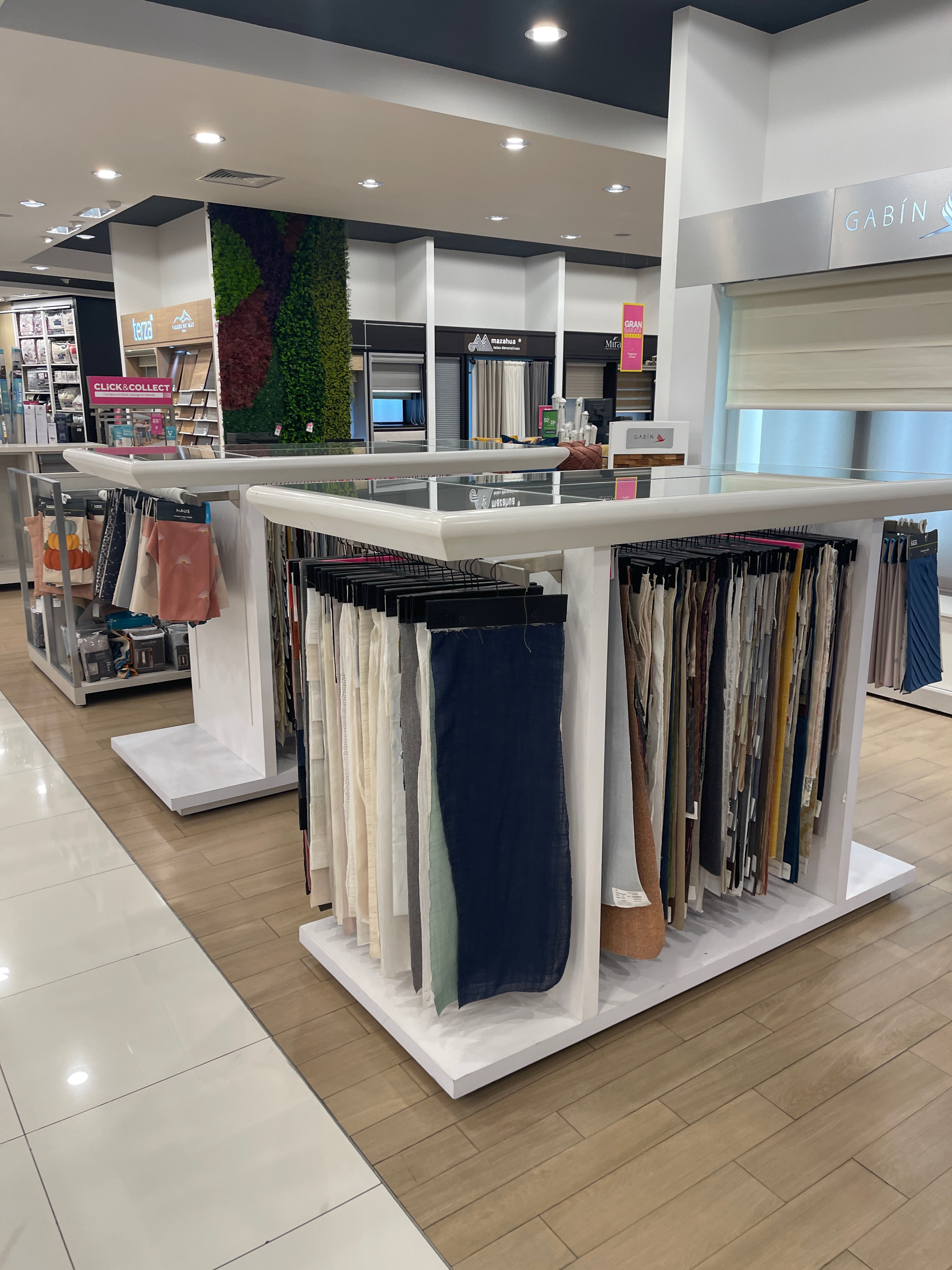
Home fabrics

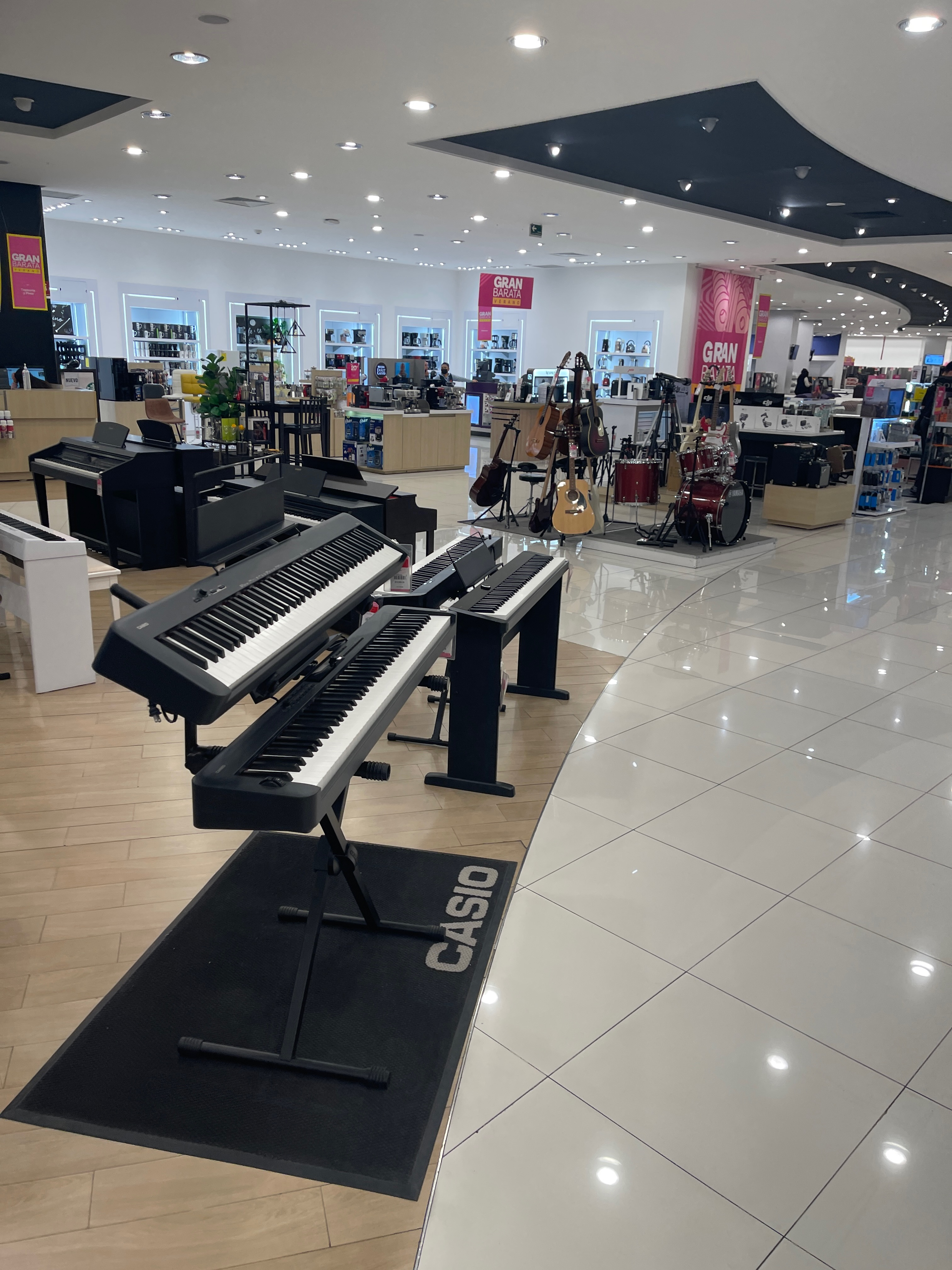
Instruments

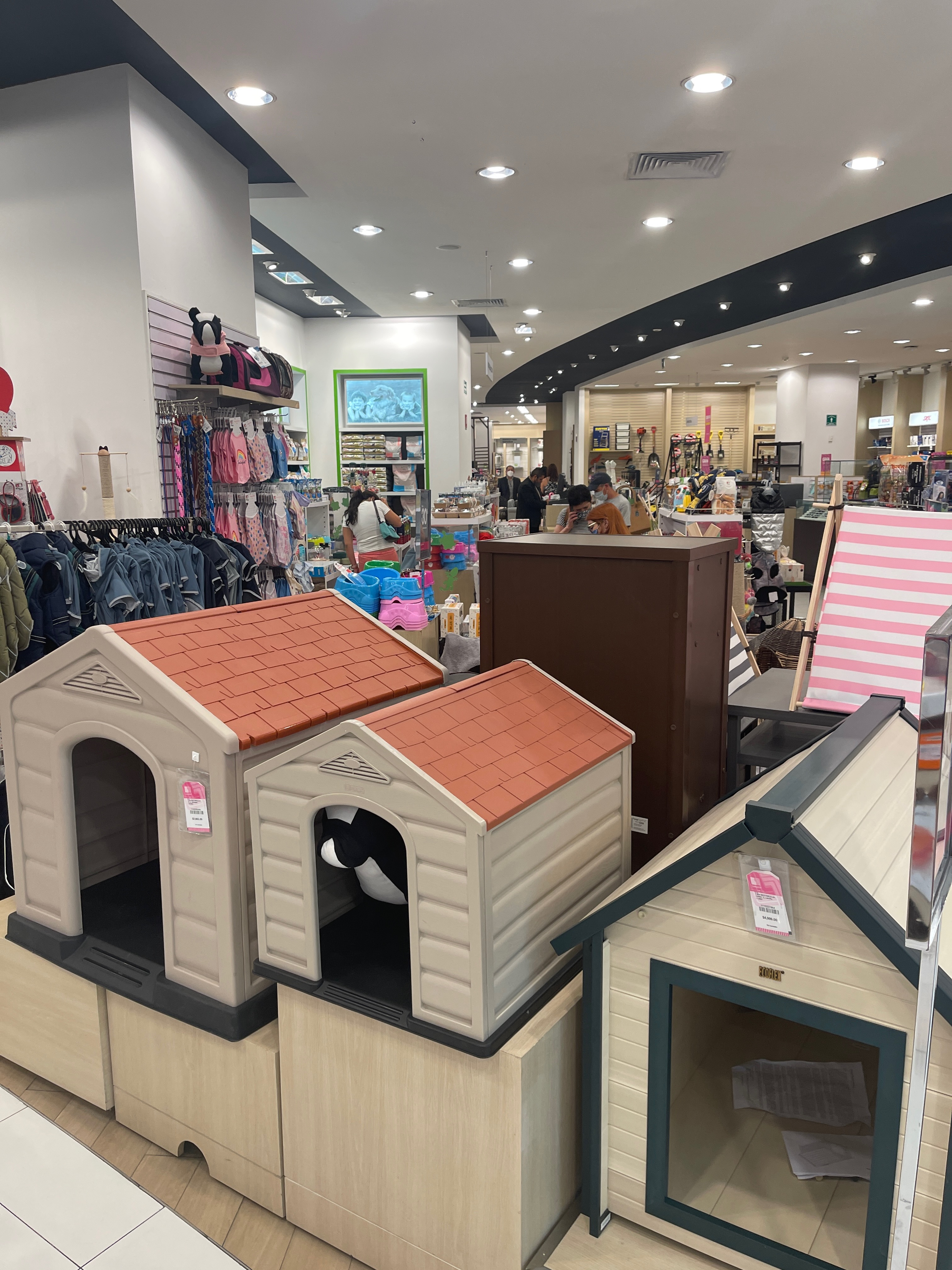
Pet dept.

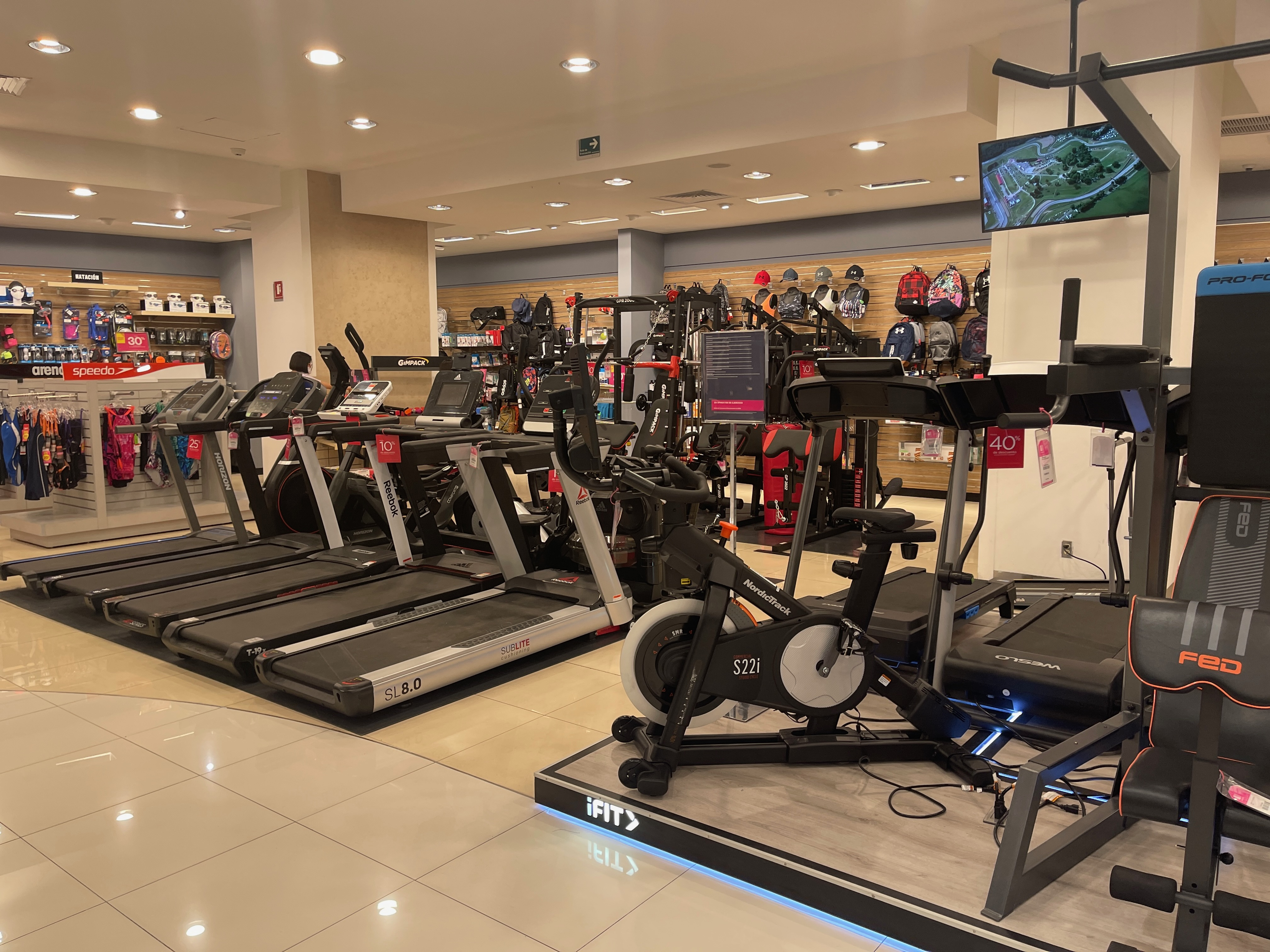
Home fitness

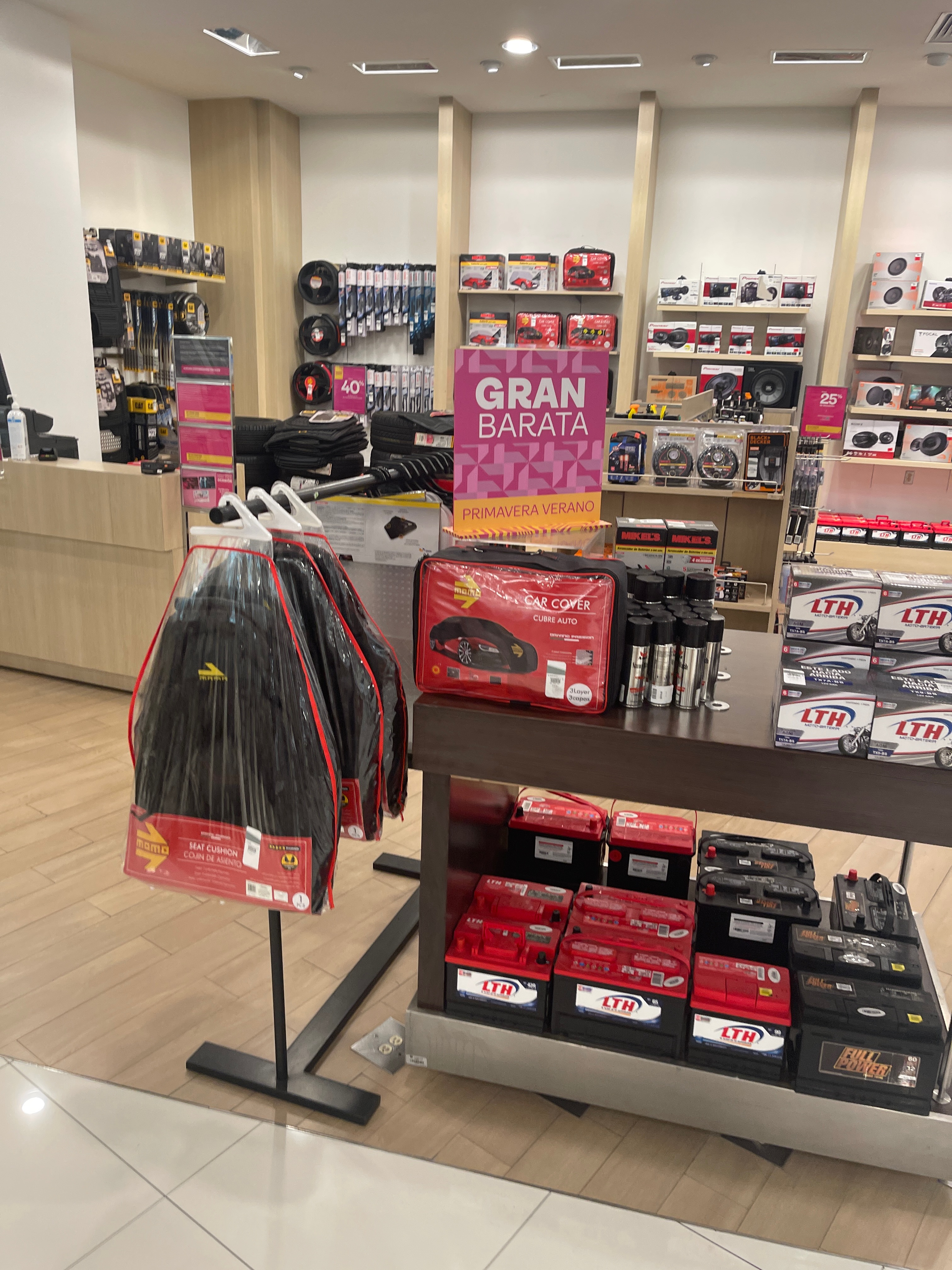
Automotive

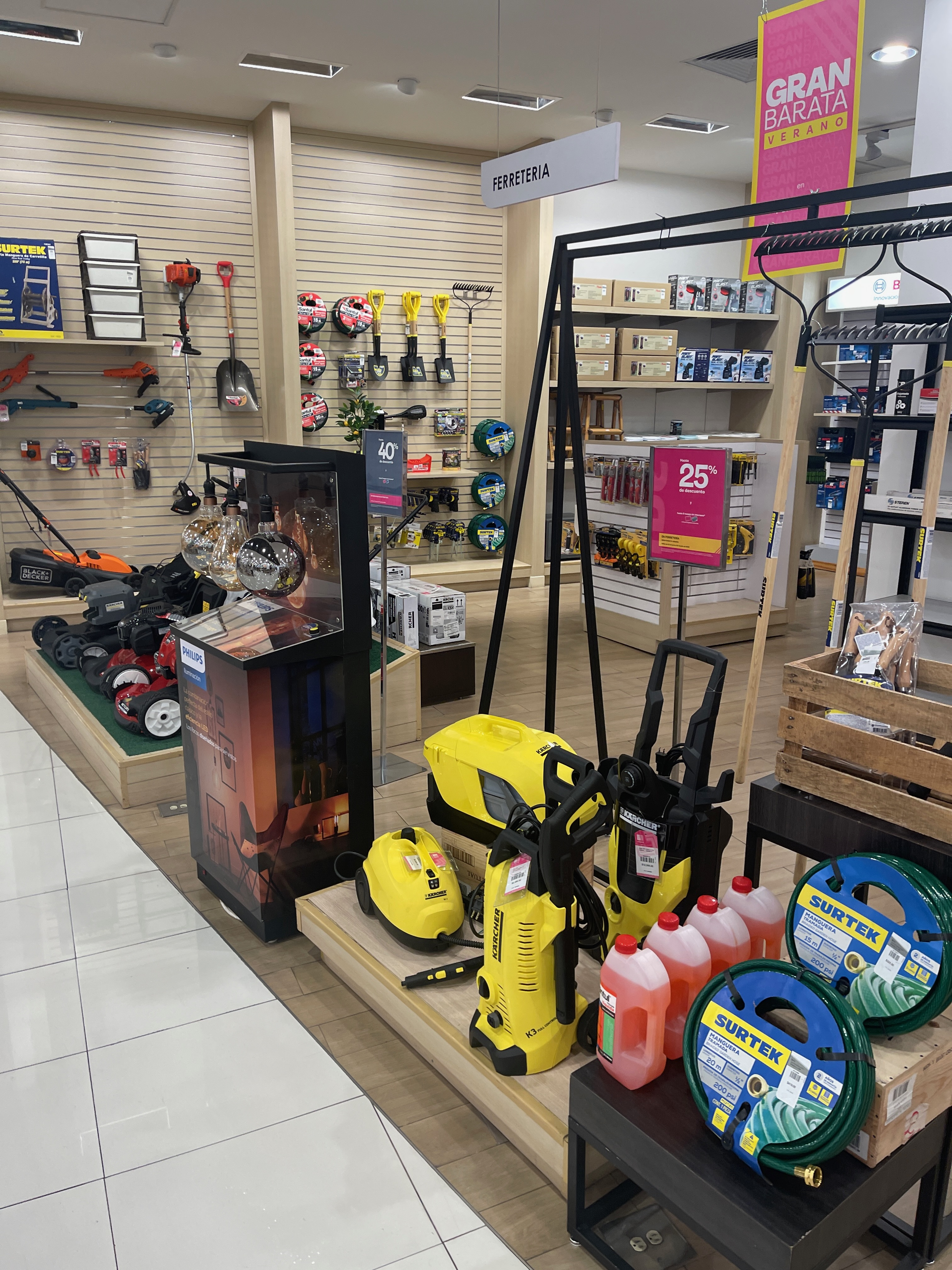
Gardening

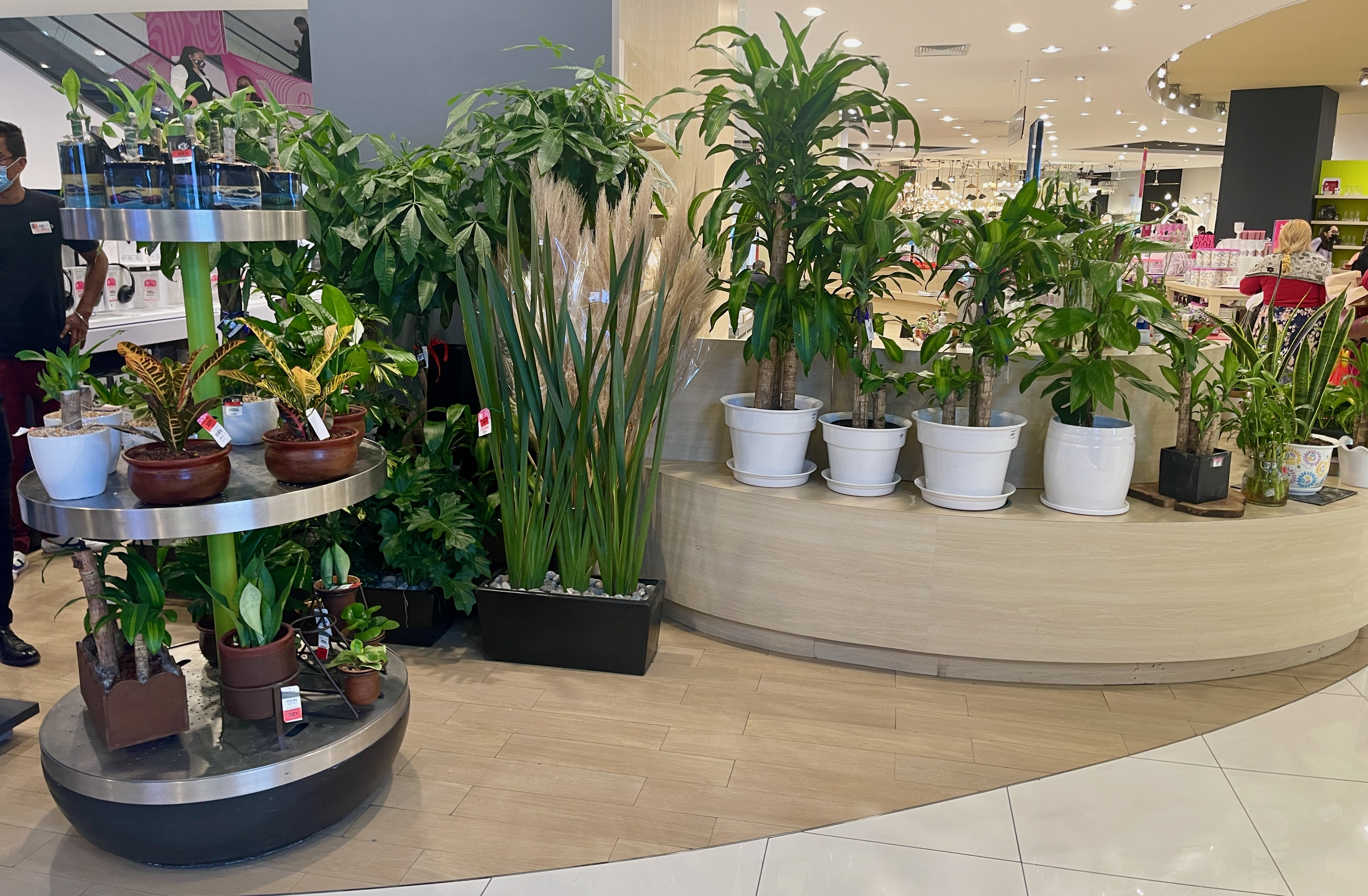
Houseplants

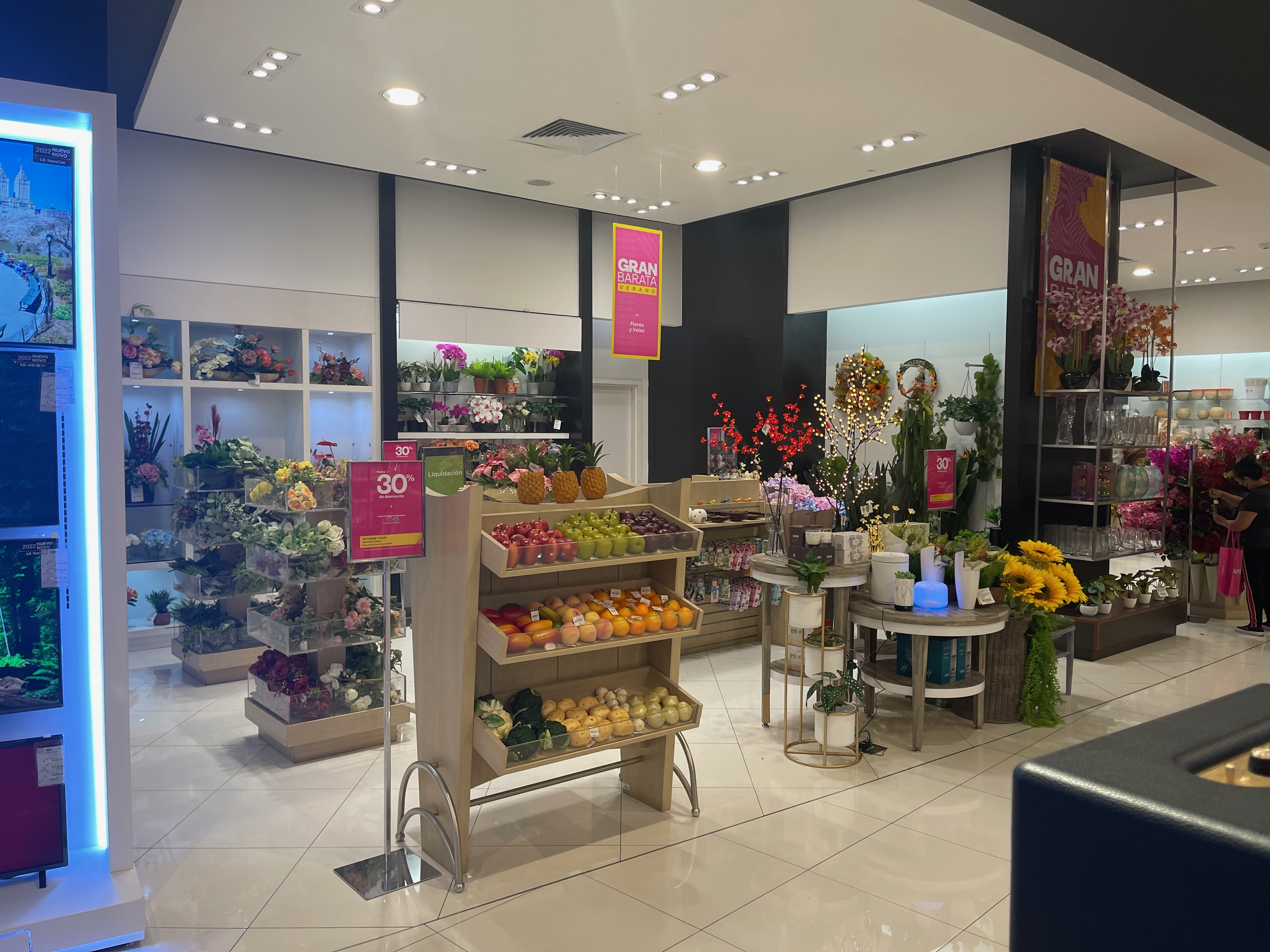
Wax fruit and artificial flowers

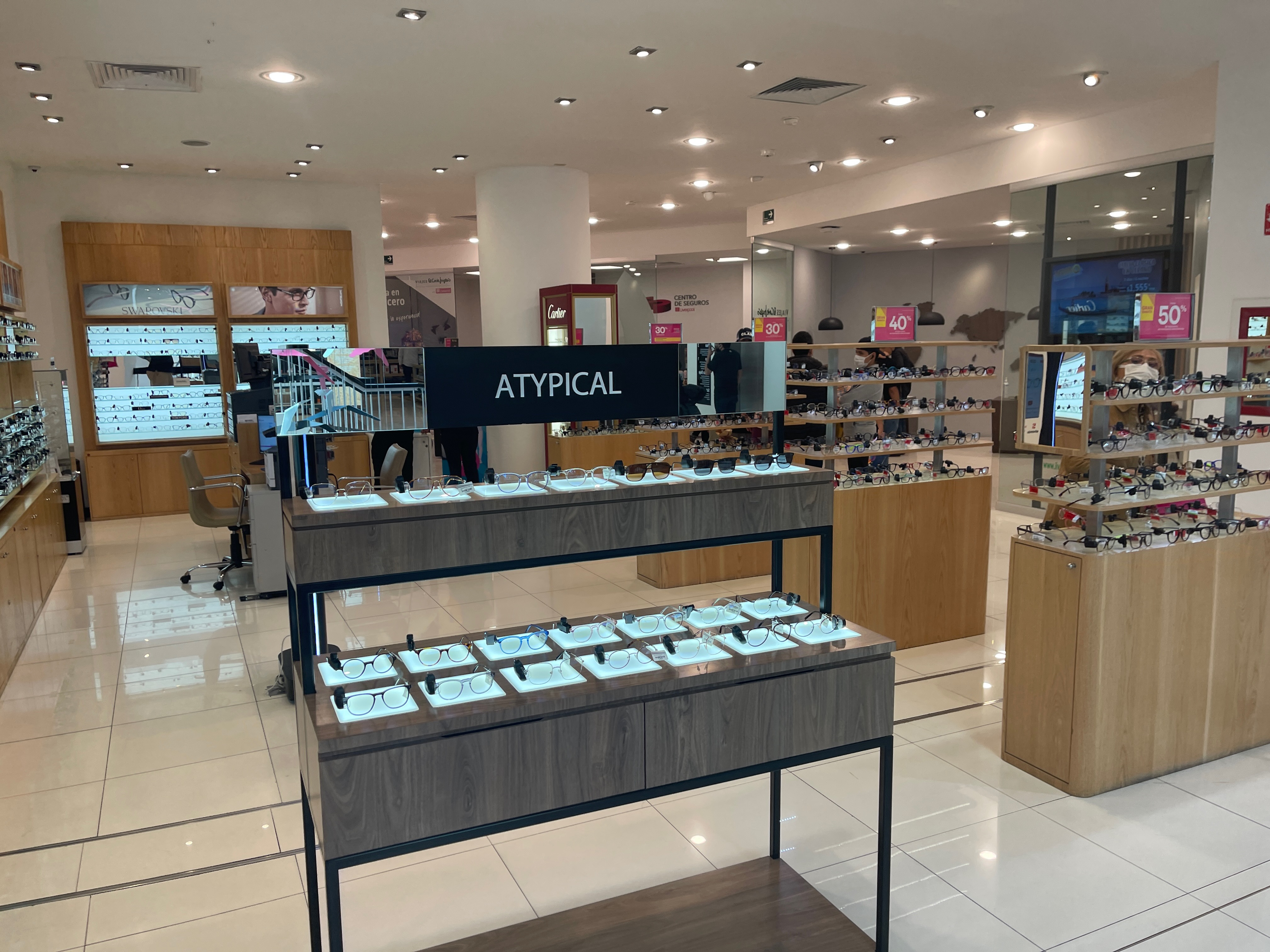
Optical

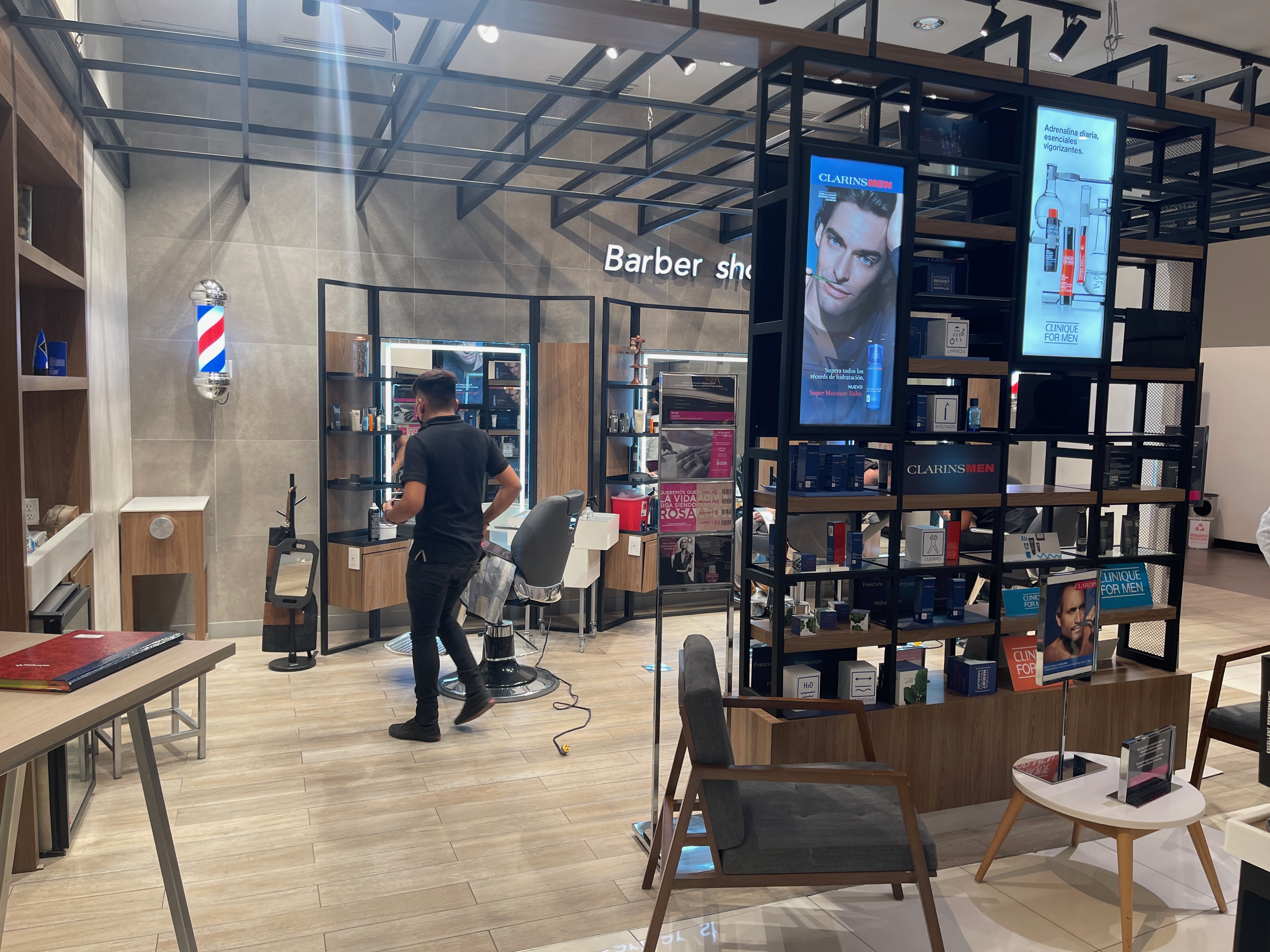
Barber shop

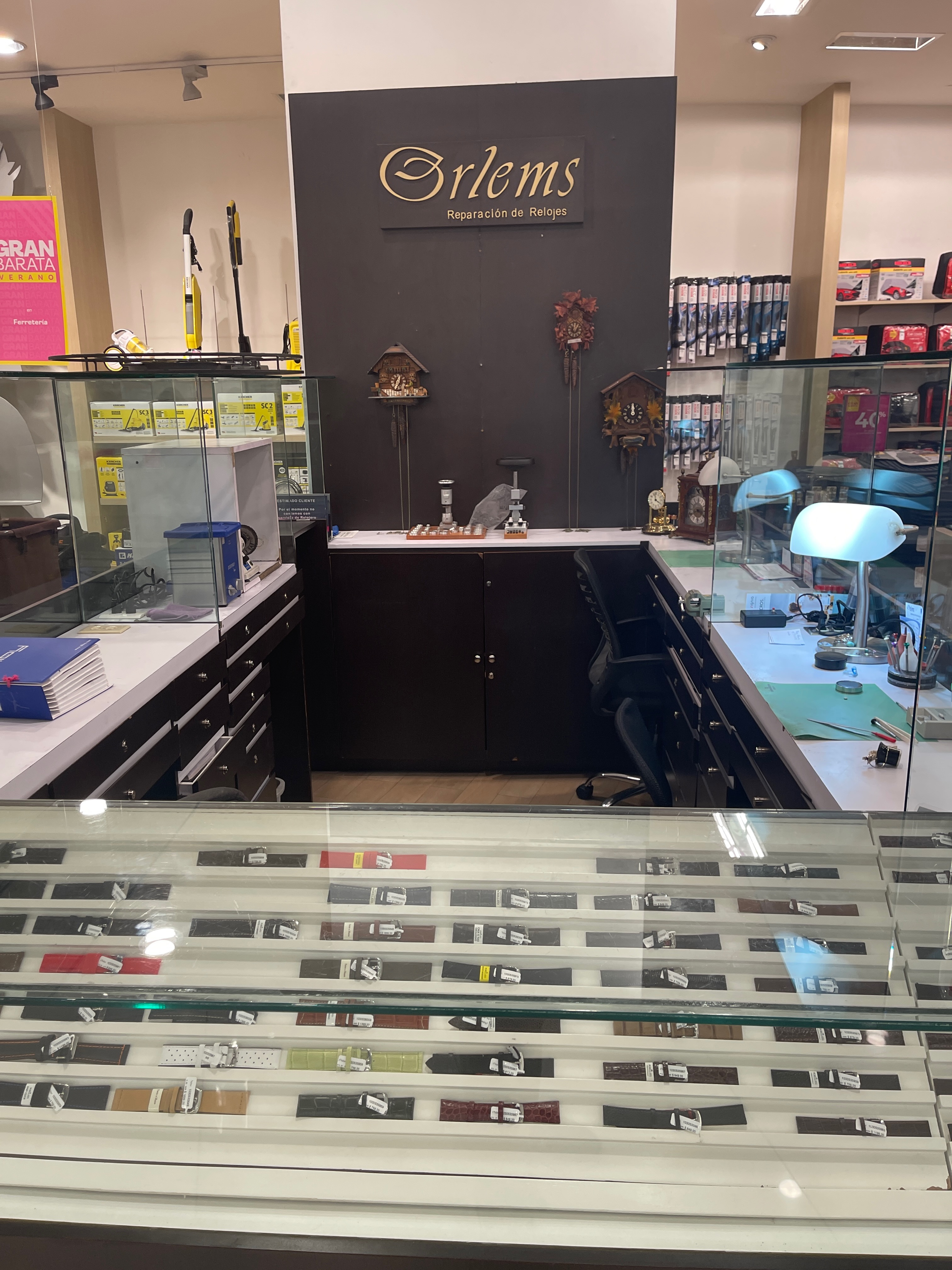
Watch repair

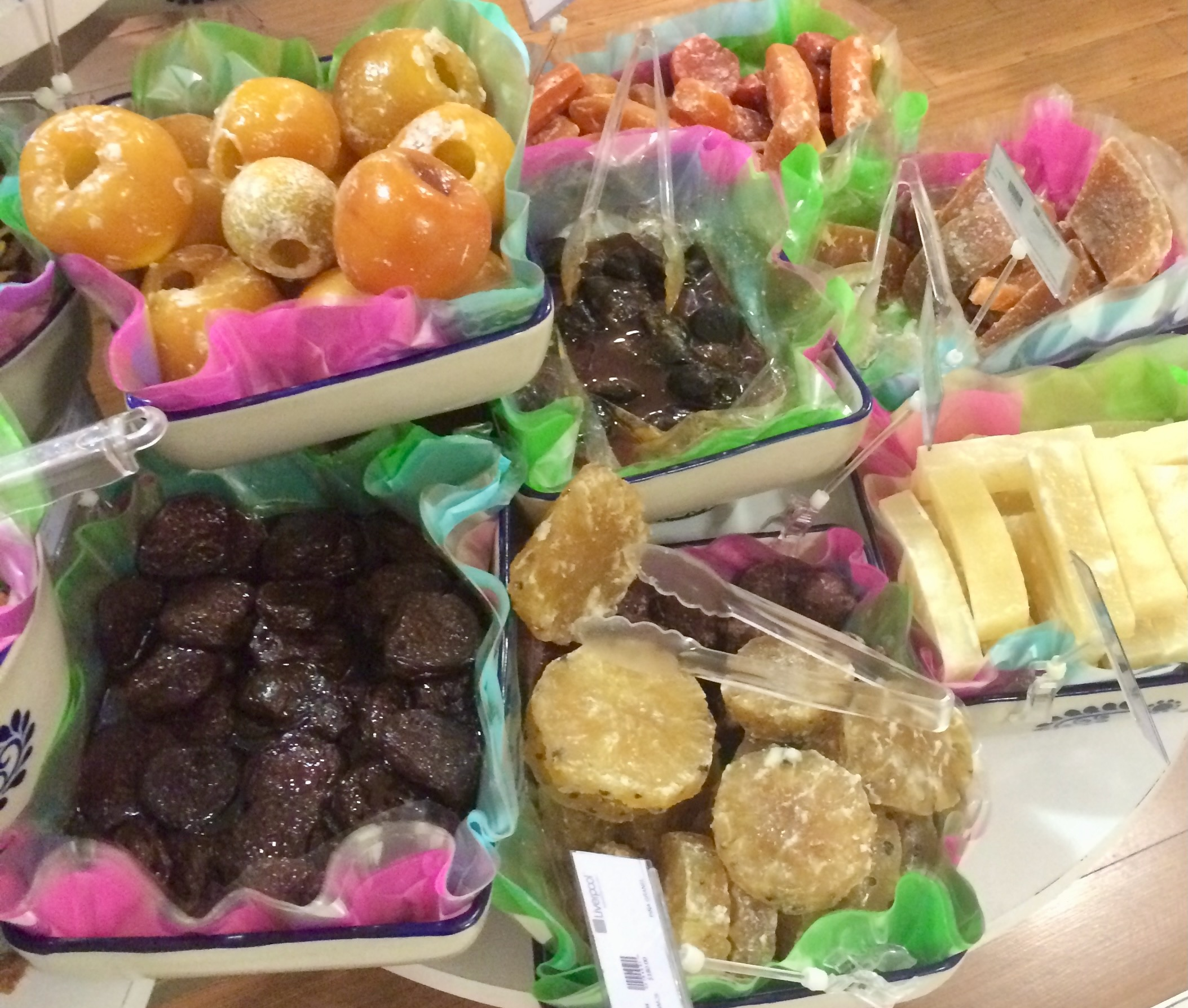
Candy

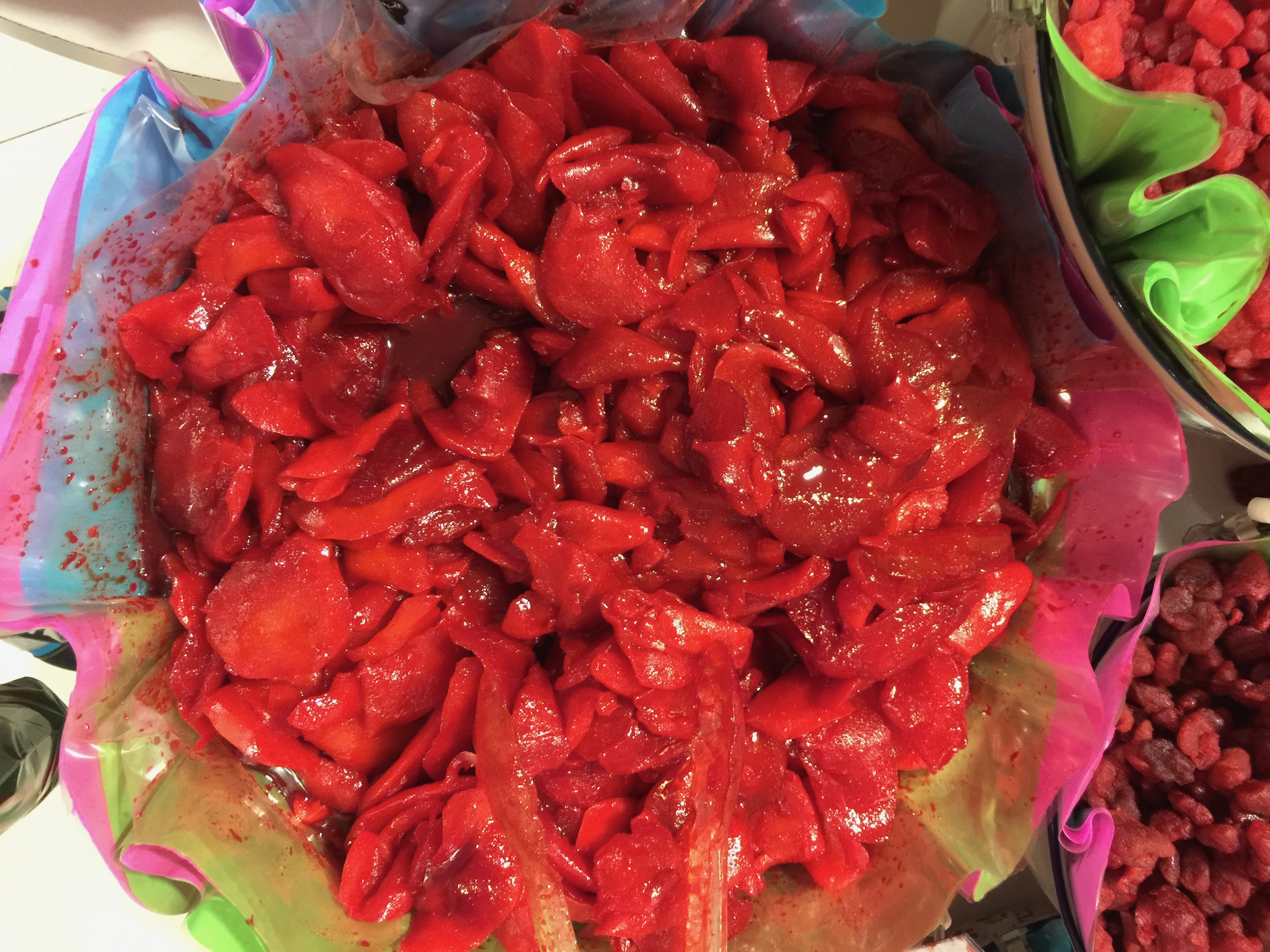
Candy

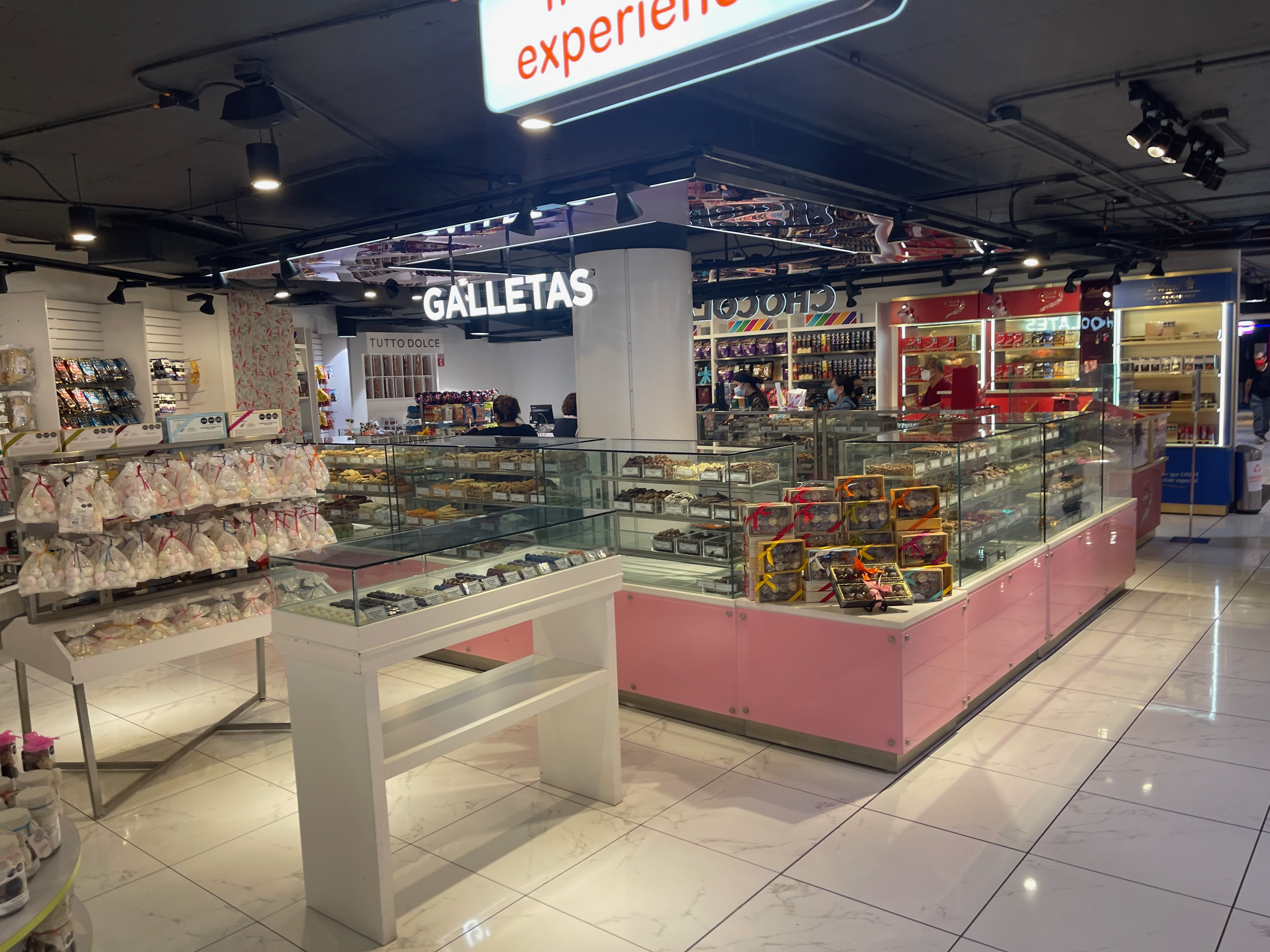
Candy

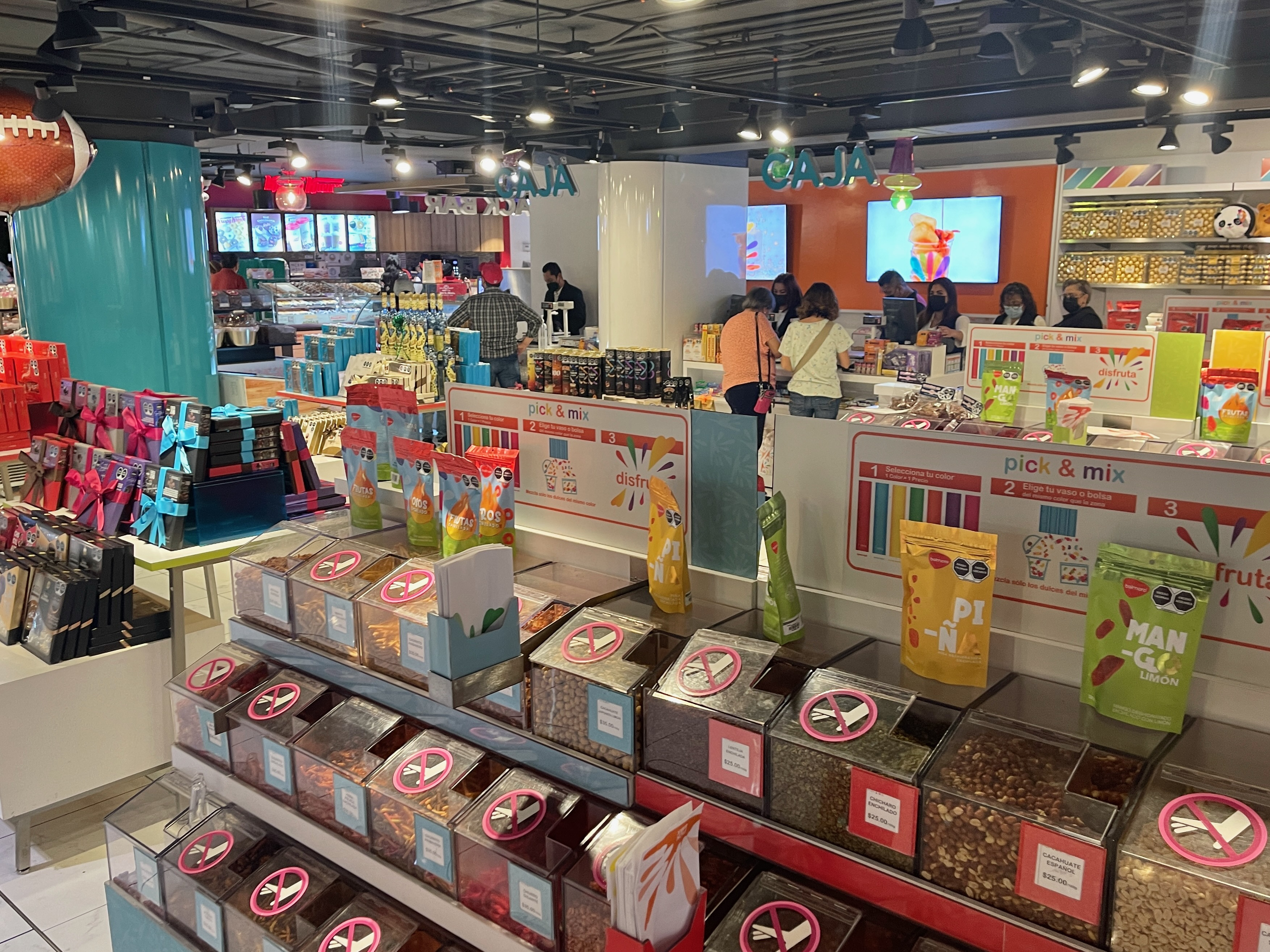
Candy

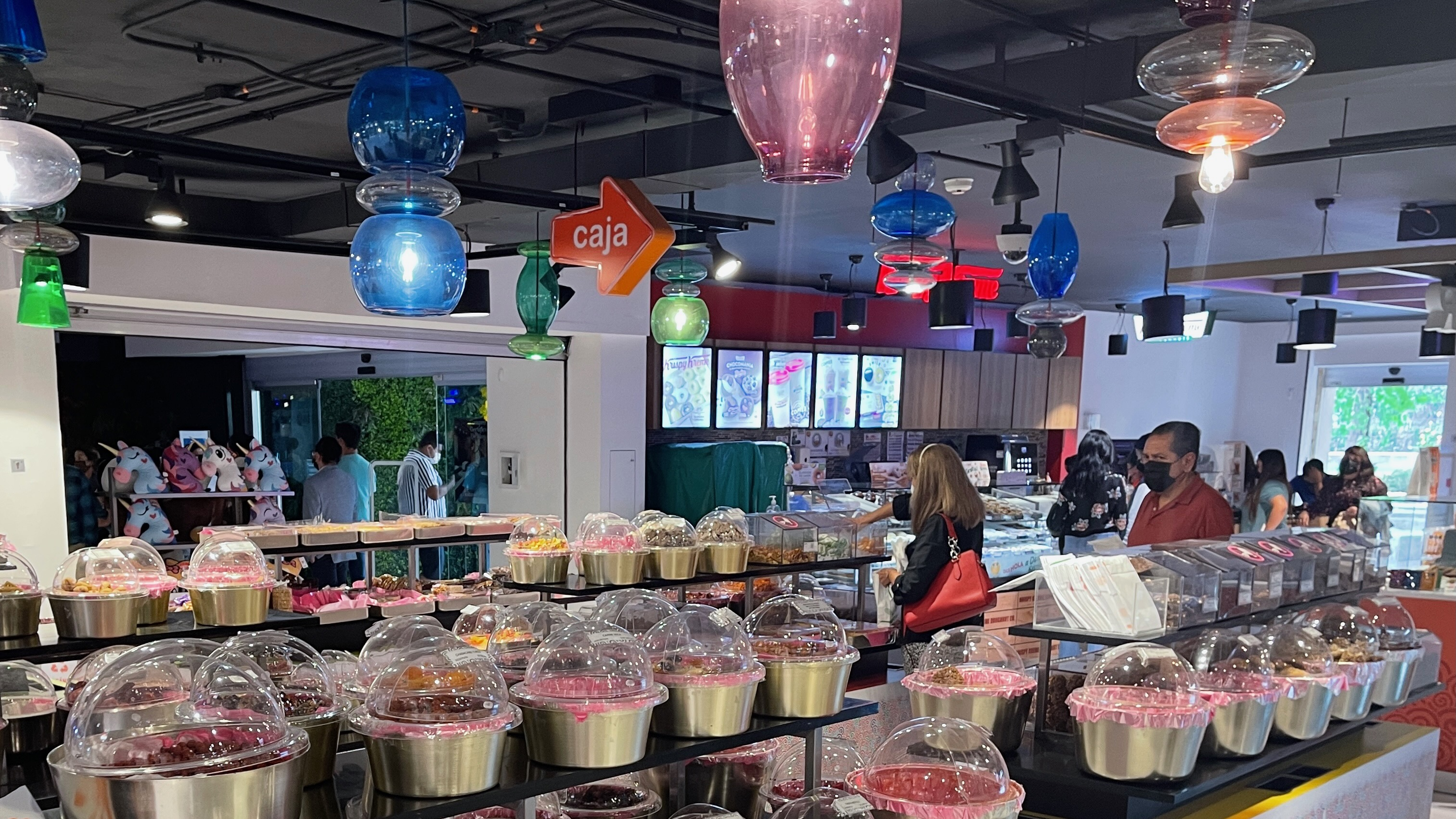
Candy

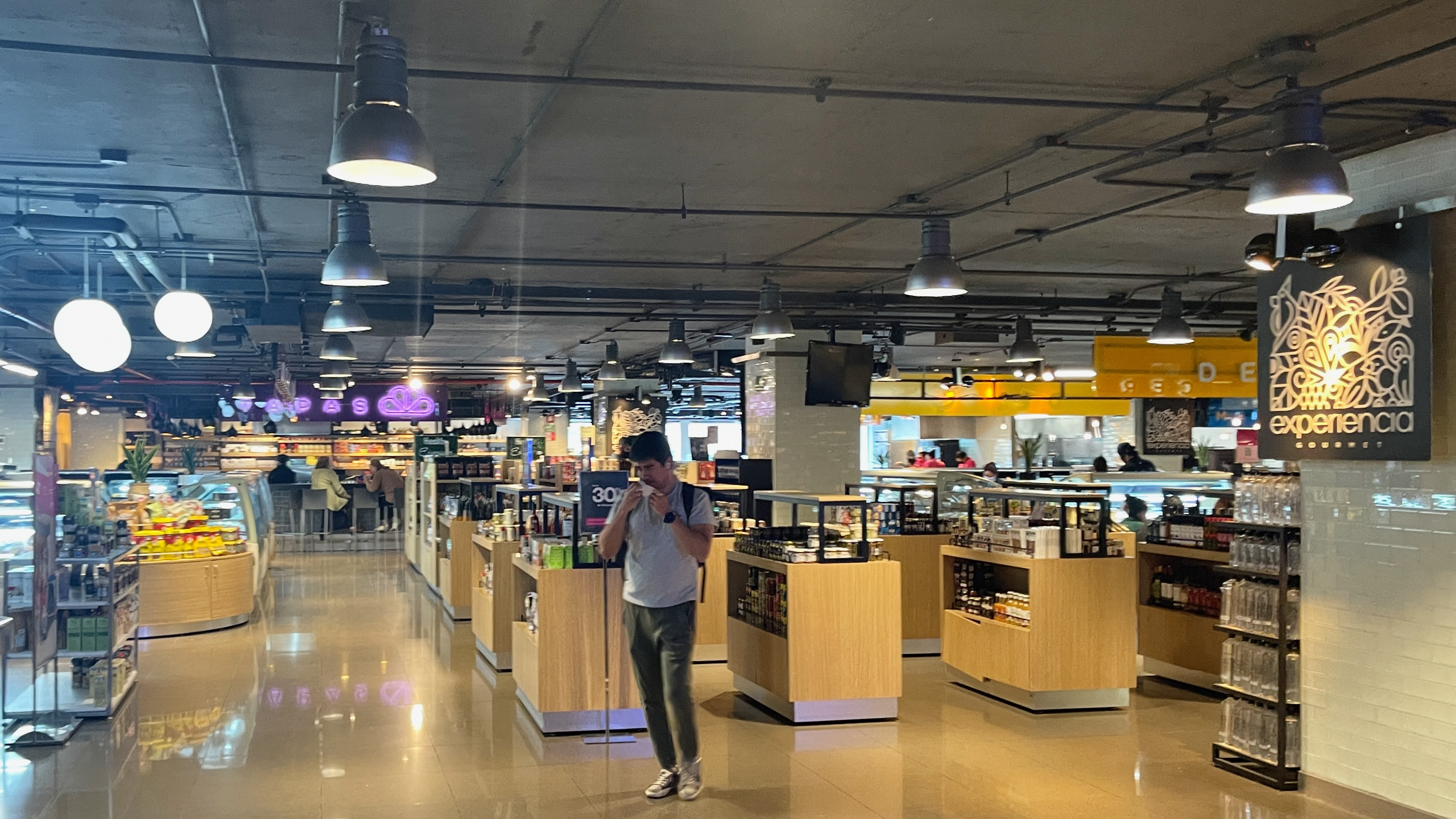
Food hall

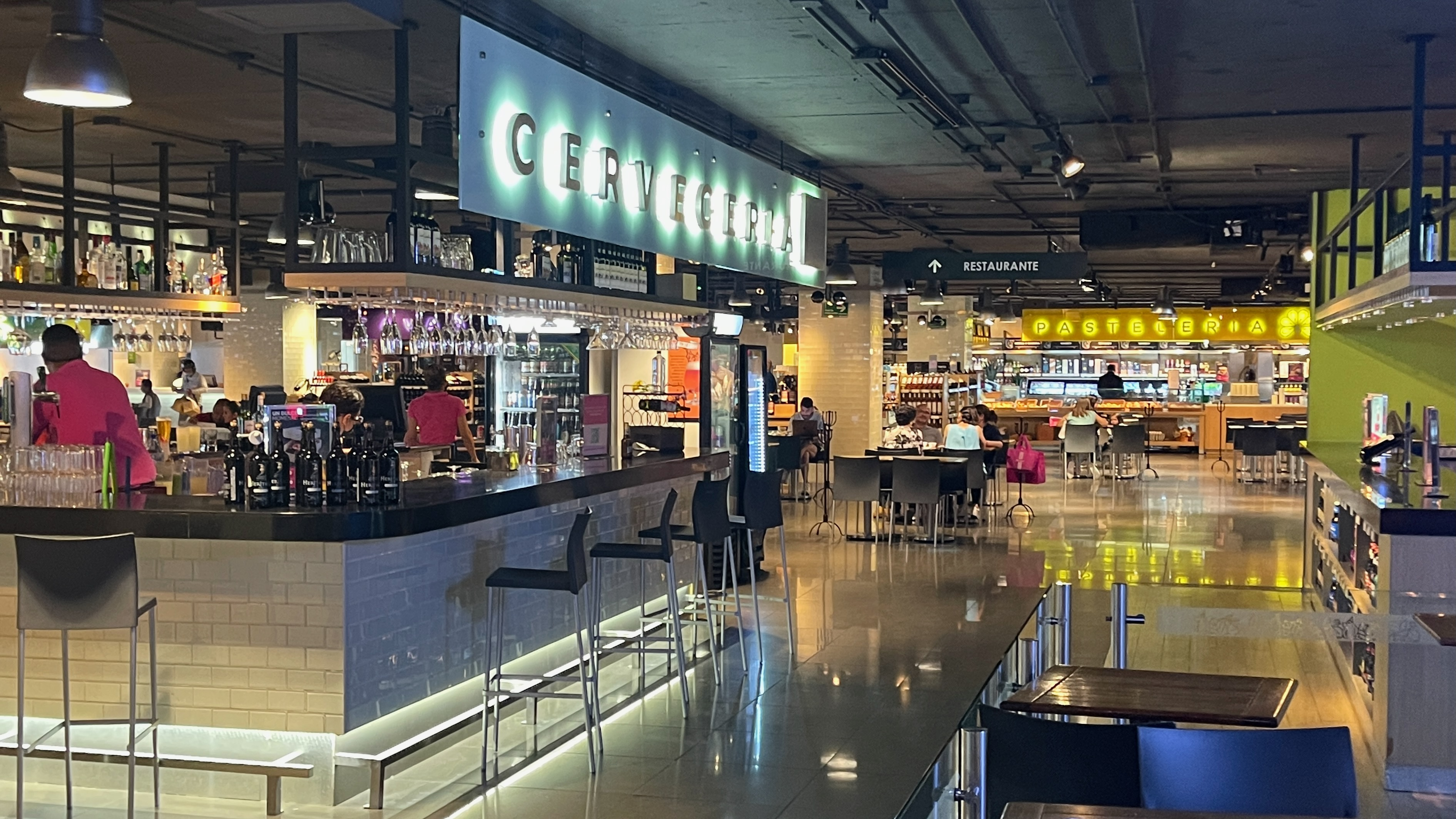
Food hall

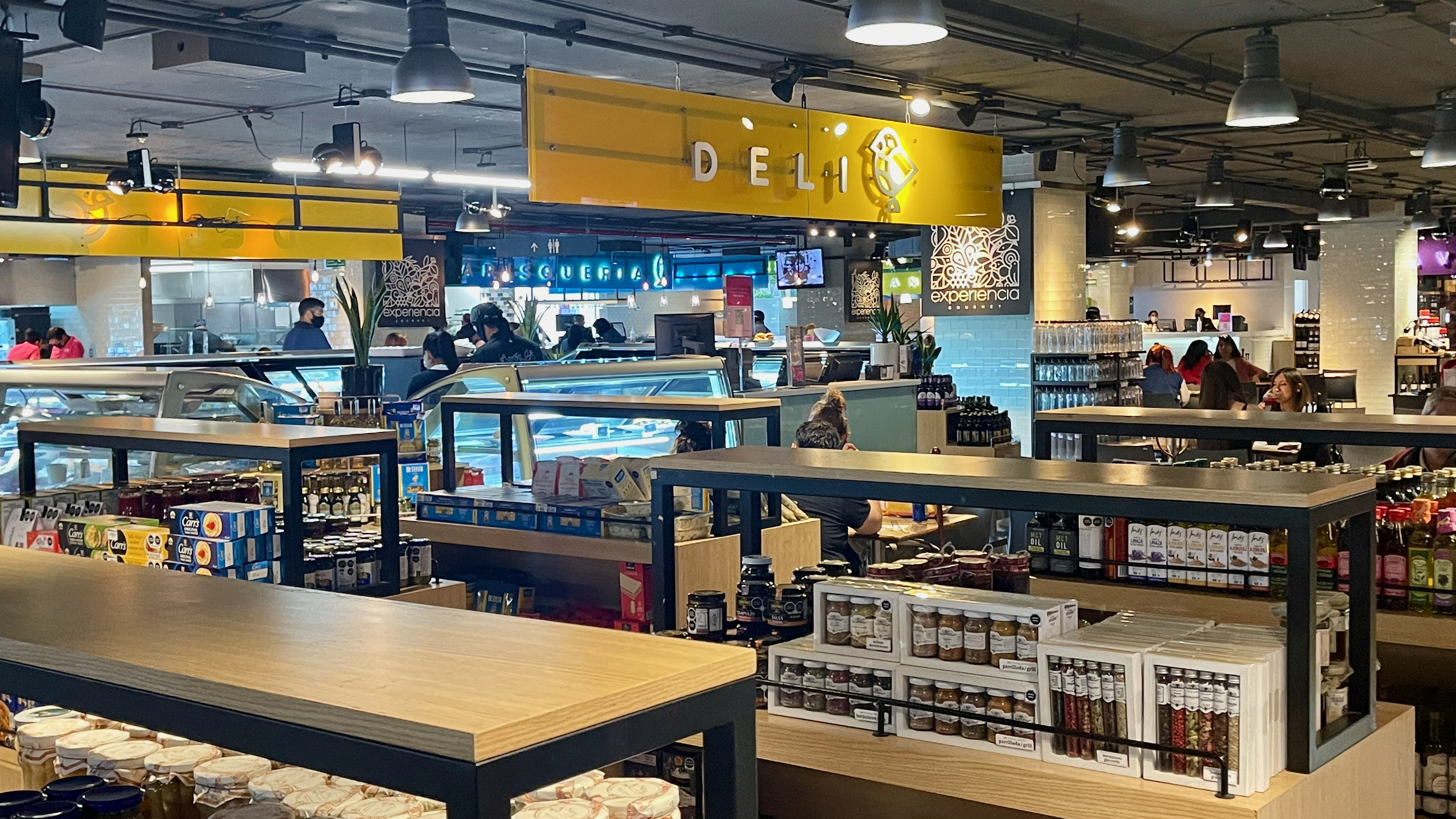
Food hall

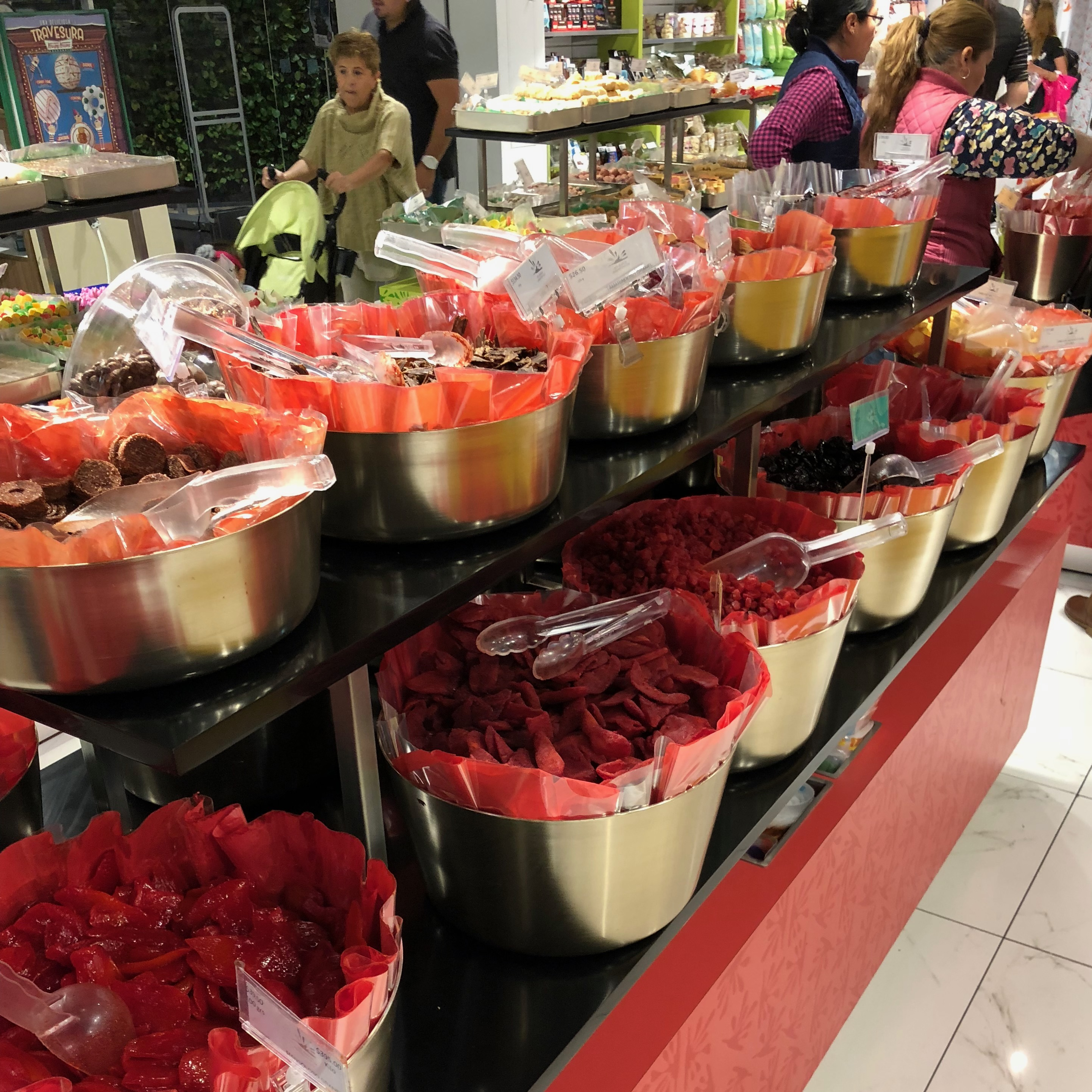
Food hall

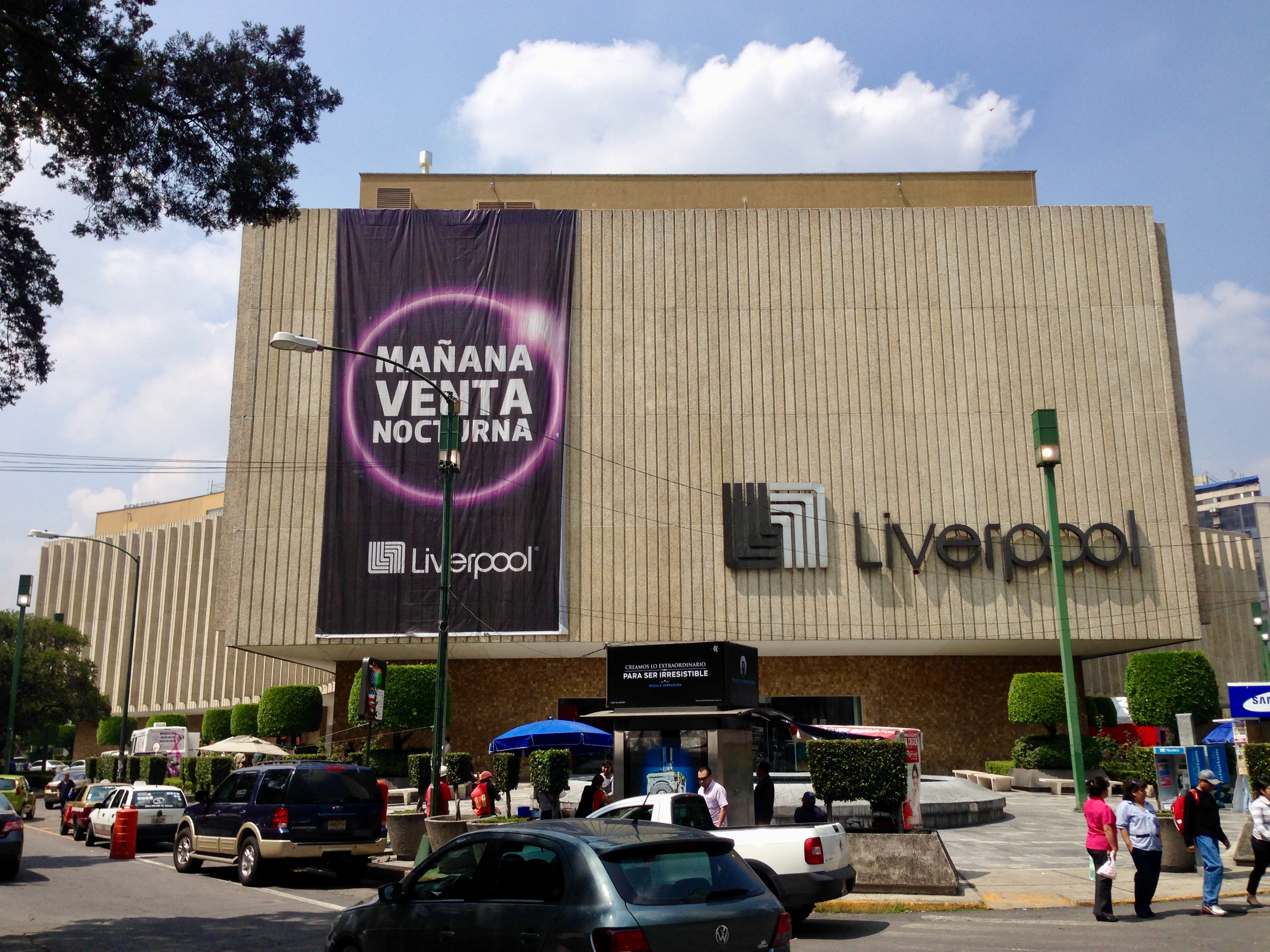
Escobedo & Horacio St.

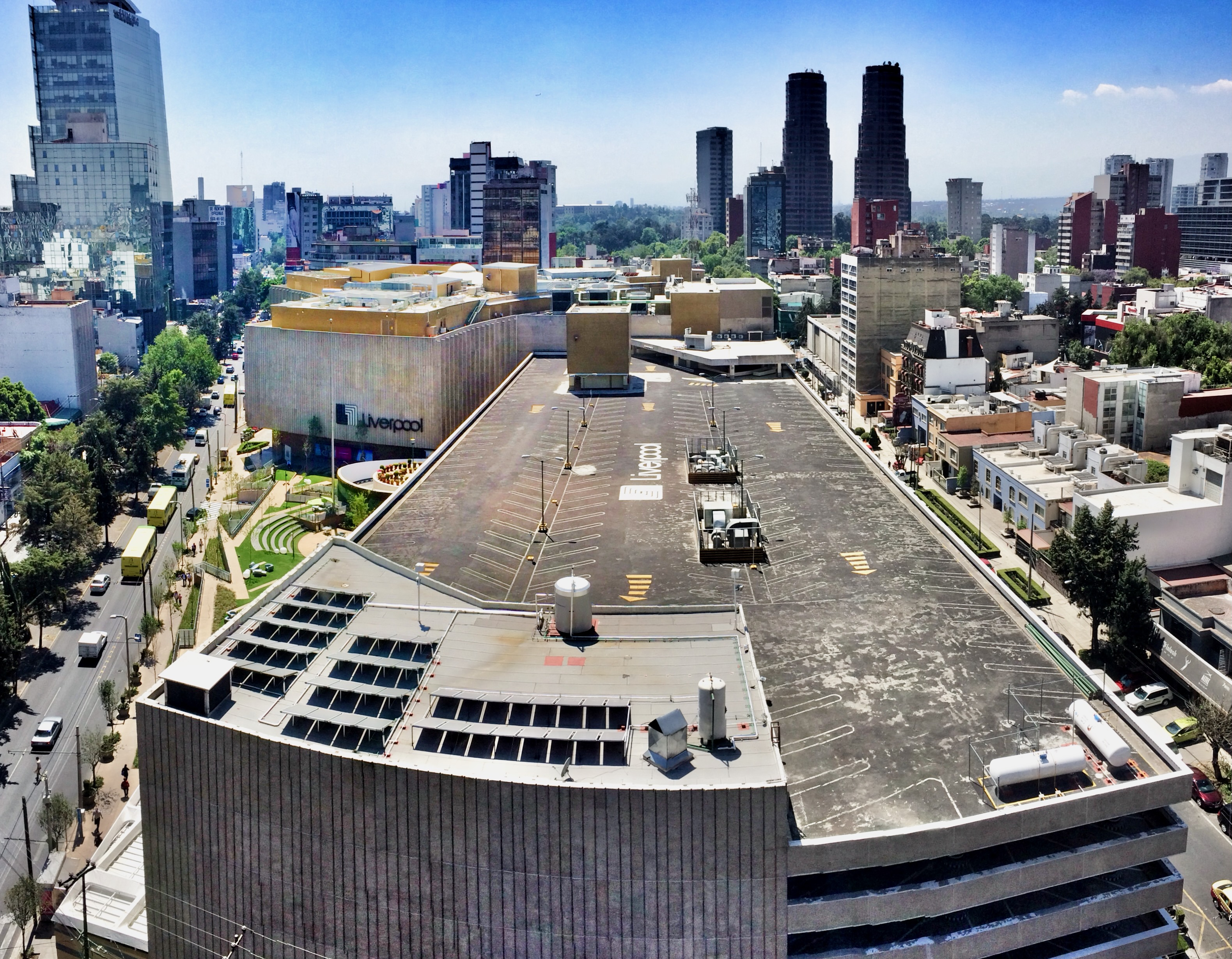
Parking structure and store

== Events ==
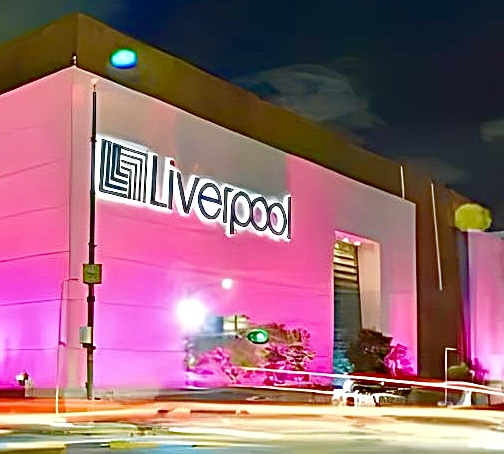
Liverpool Parque Delta at night illuminated in the chain's signature pink

=== Fashion Fest ===
Fashion Fest of Liverpool is an annual festival that covers new fashion trends for the new seasons, it has reunited some of the most important supermodels like: Valeria Mazza, Esther Cañadas, Eva Herzigova, Cindy Crawford, Heidi Klum, Gisele Bündchen, Adriana Lima, Claudia Schiffer, Julianne Moore, Alessandra Ambrosio, Doutzen Kroes, Bar Refaeli, Olivia Wilde, Milla Jovovich, and most recently Irina Shayk

== Liverpool Stores ==
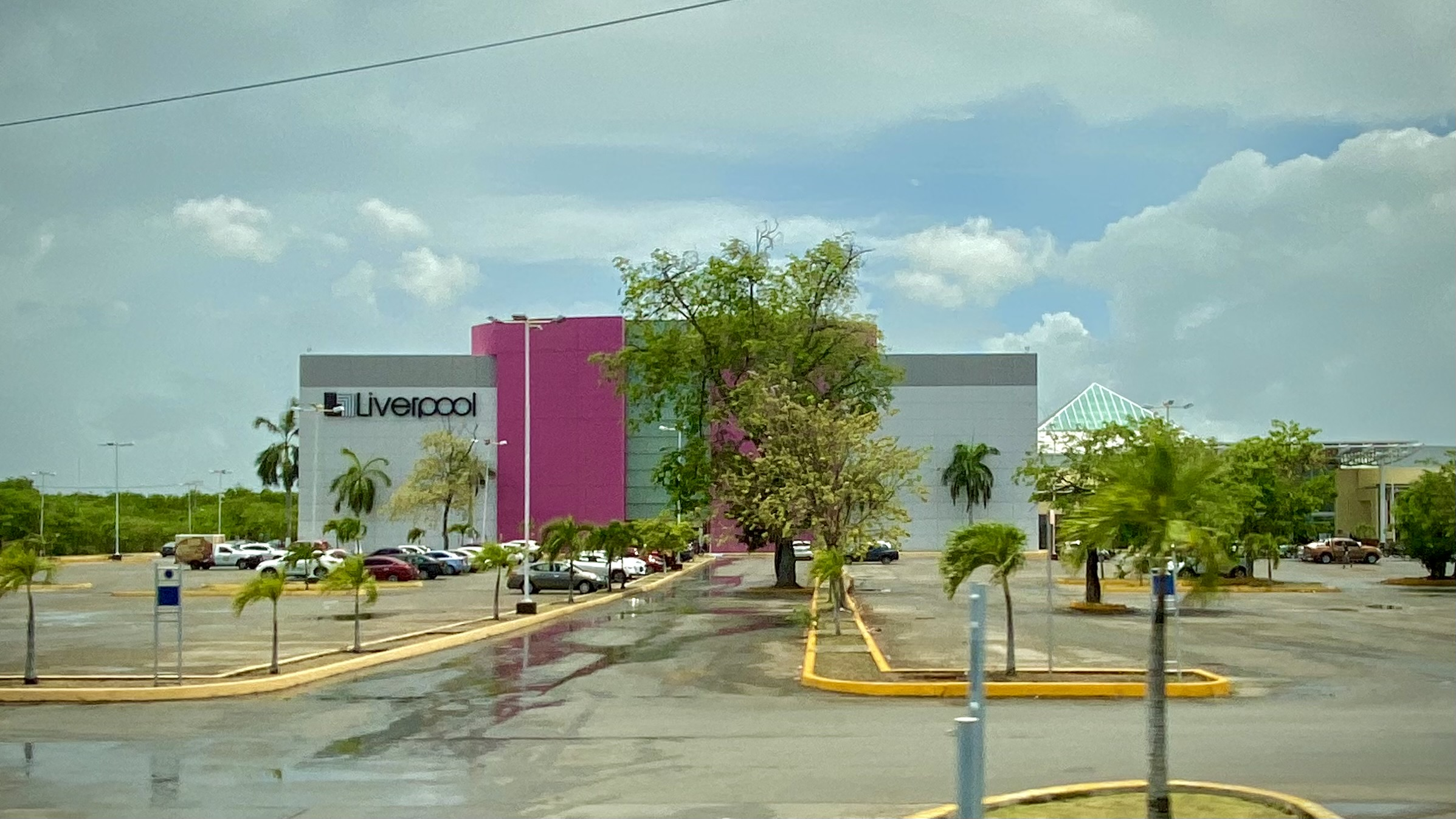
Chetumal

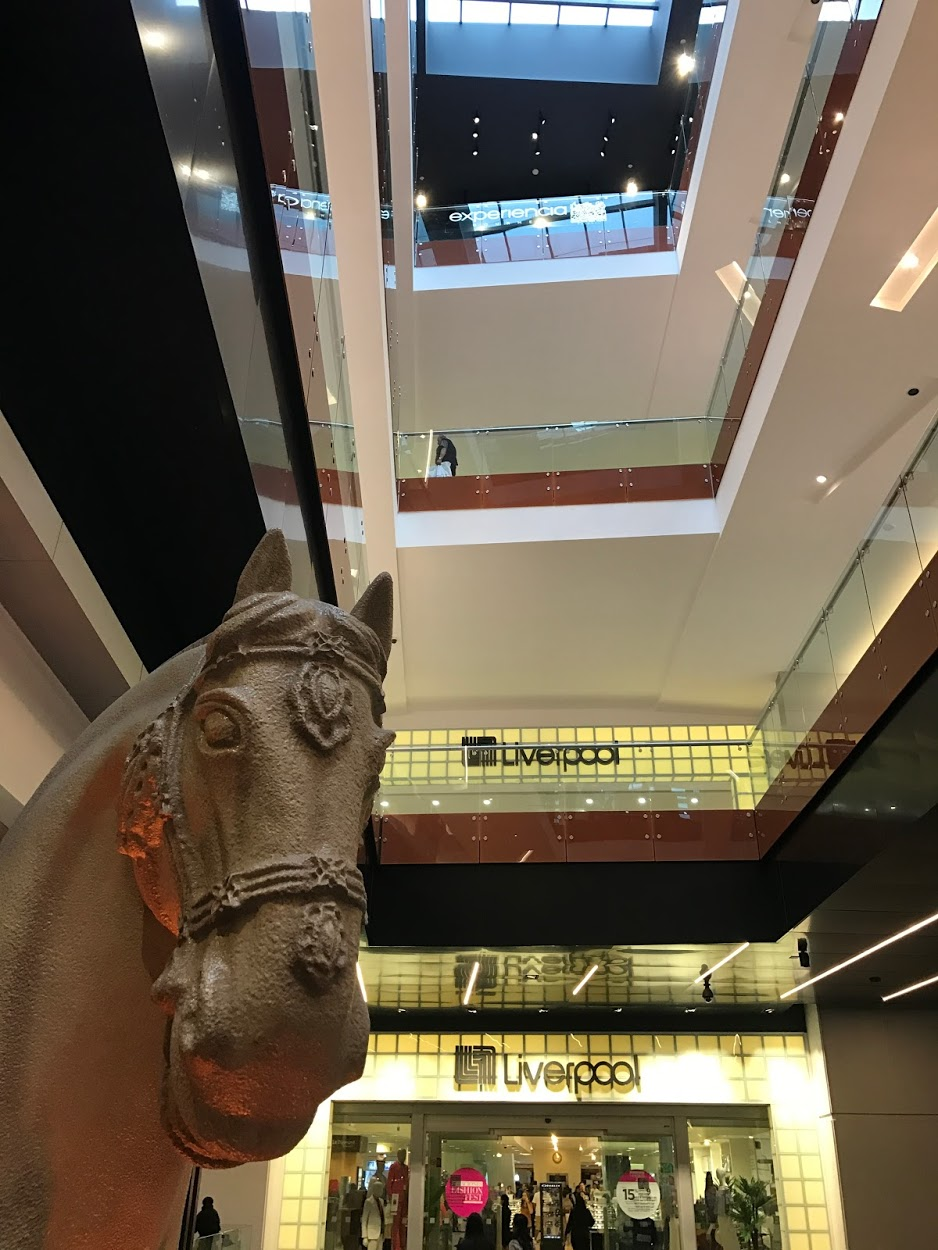
Parque Delta, Mexico City

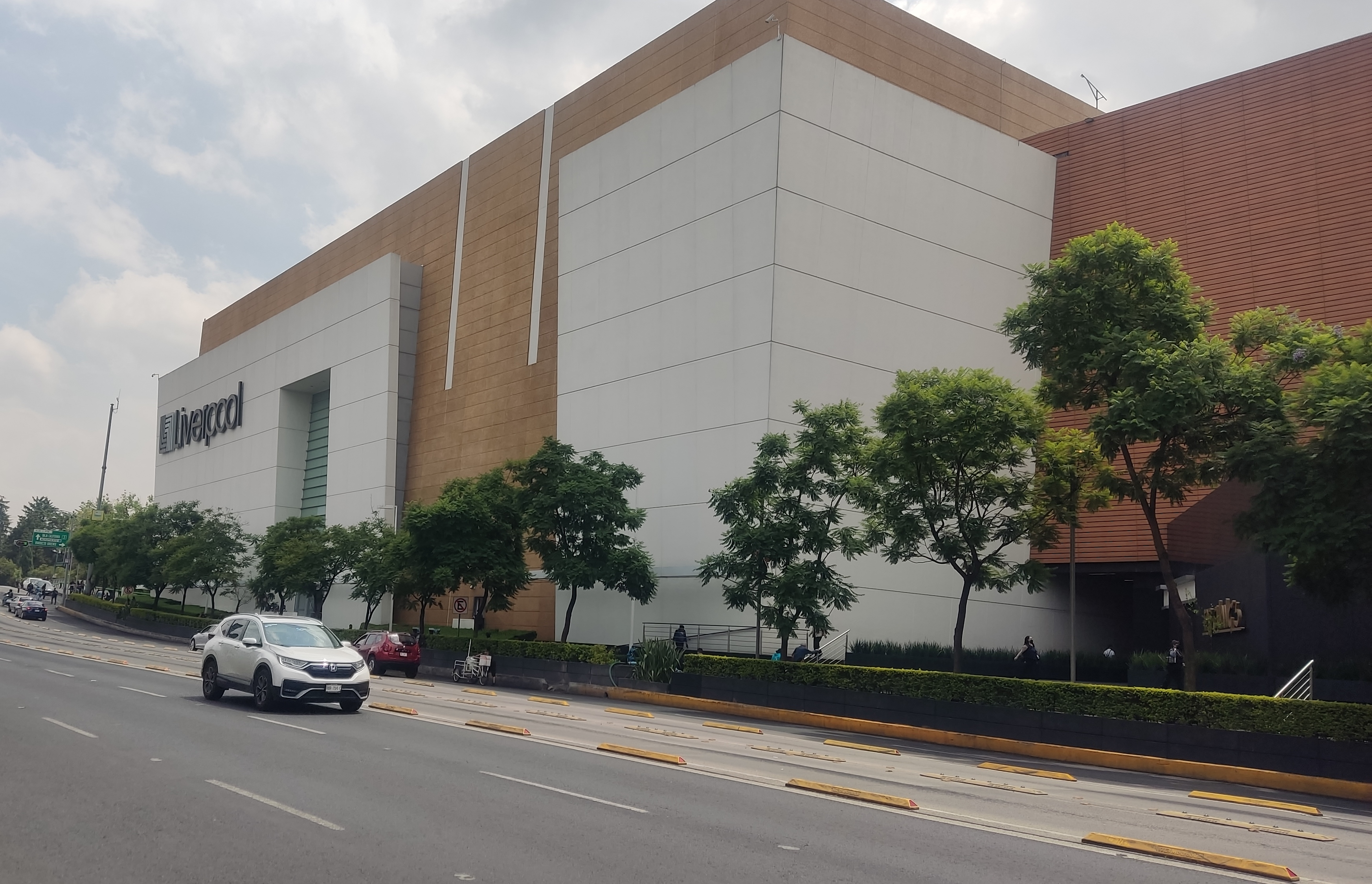
Parque Delta

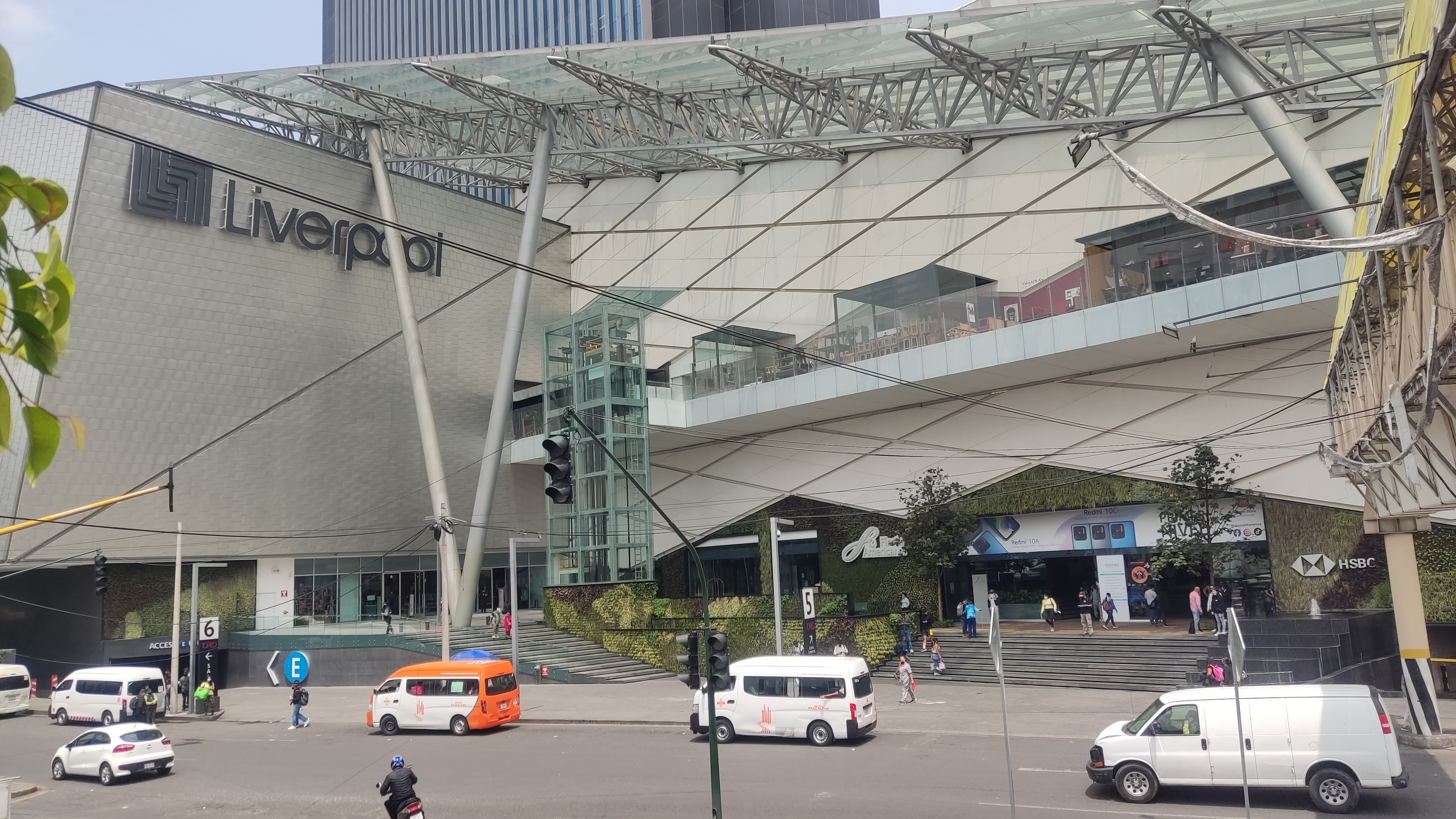
Toreo Parque Central, Greater Mexico City

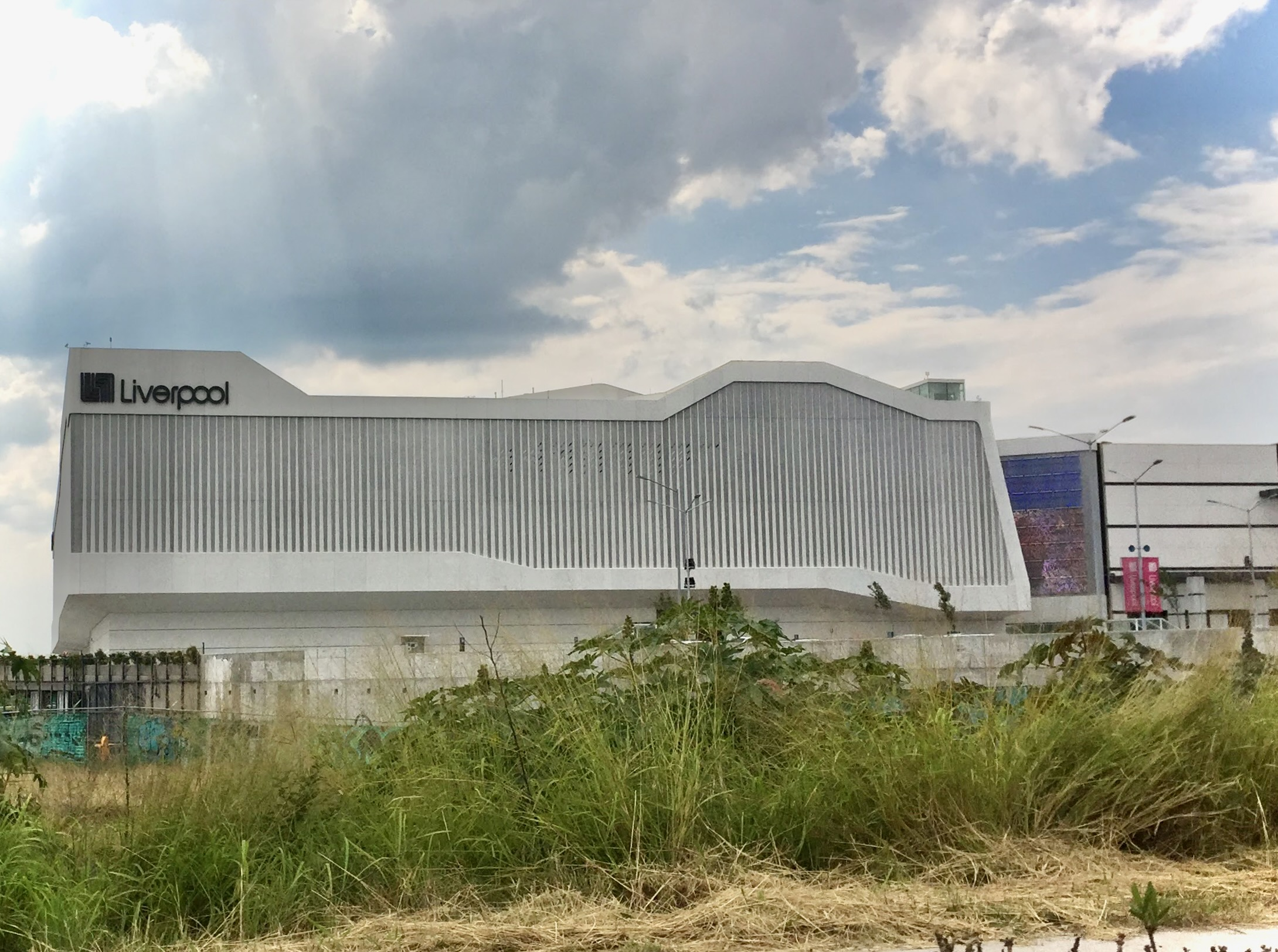
Antea, Querétaro

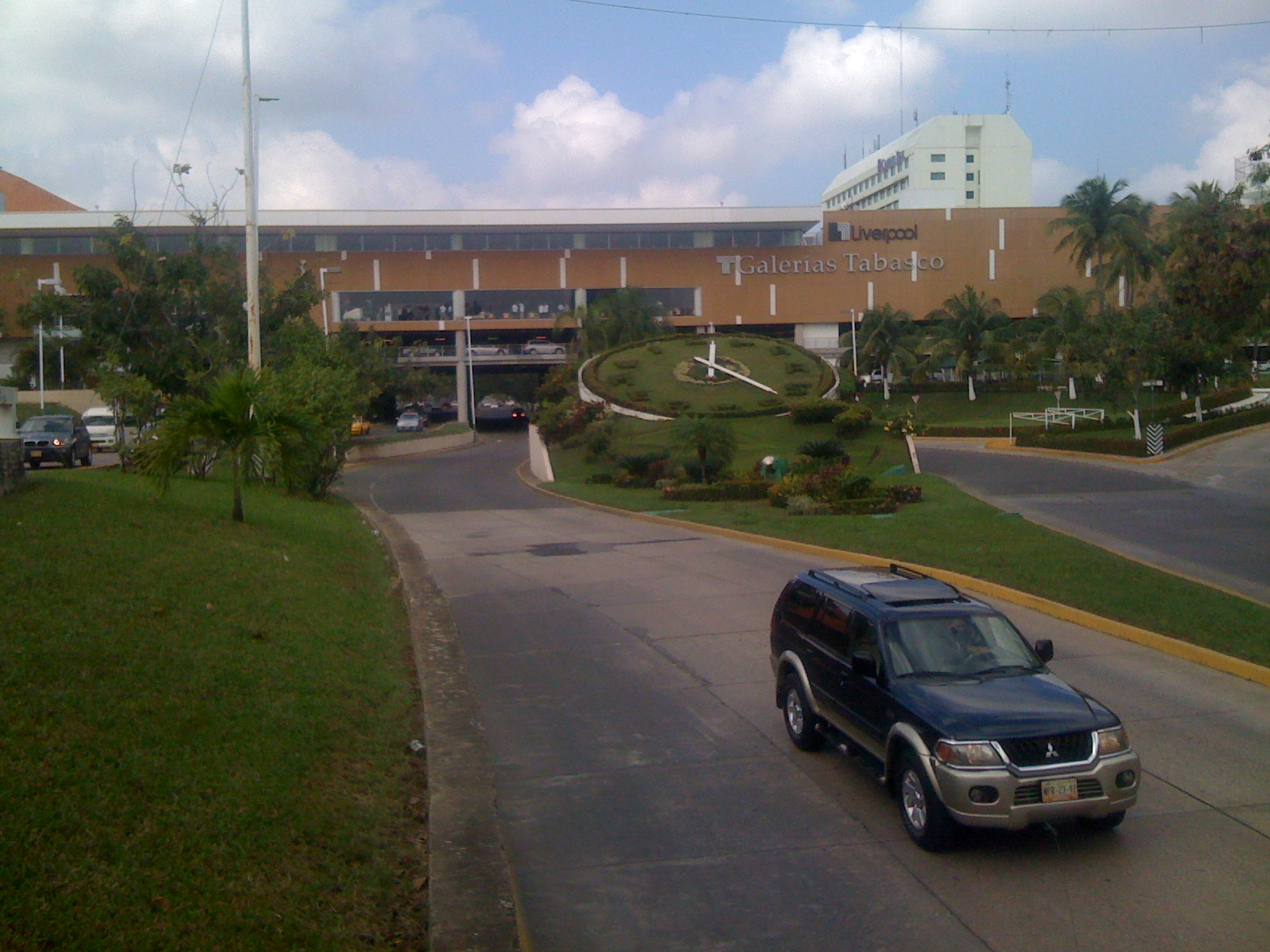
Galerías Tabasco, Villahermosa

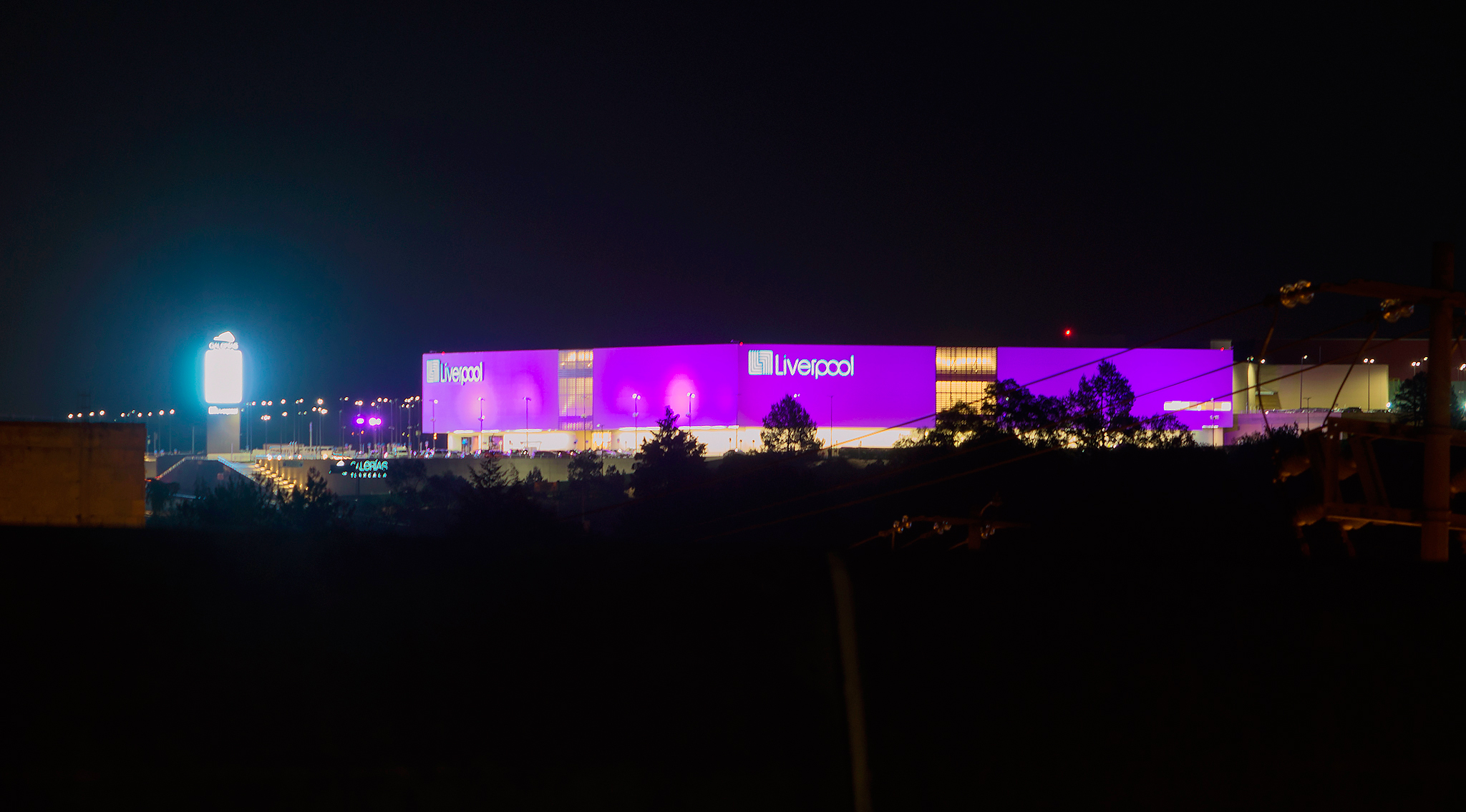
Galerías Tlaxcala

Table of Liverpool stores (2023)
| Opened | Closed | Metro area or city | Municipality/ Neighborhood | State | Mall | Store Name (2023) if diff. | Sq m (2022) | Other Name (2016) |
|---|---|---|---|---|---|---|---|---|
| 1999 | | Acapulco | | Gro. | Galerías Acapulco | Acapulco Galerías | 10,852 | Fábricas de Francia Acapulco |
| 2008 | | Acapulco | | Gro. | La Isla Shopping Village | Acapulco La Isla | 9,218 | Acapulco |
| 2007 | | Aguascalientes | | Ags. | Villasunción | Ags. Villasunción | 15,113 | Aguascalientes |
| 1986 | | Aguascalientes | | Ags. | Altaria | Ags. Altaria | 6,094 | Fábricas de Francia Aguascalientes |
| 2018 | | Atlixco | | Pue. | Moraleda | Atlixco | 6247 | |
| 2012 | | Campeche | | Camp. | Galerías Campeche | | 13,605 | |
| 1998 | | Cancún | | Q.R. | Plaza las Américas | Cancún | 10,119 | Cancun Américas |
| 2008 | | Celaya | | Gto. | Galerías Celaya | | 14,749 | |
| 2004 | | Chetumal | | Q.R. | Plaza Las Américas Chetumal | Chetumal | 11,139 | |
| 2000 | | Chihuahua | | Chih. | Chihuahua Fashion Mall | | 8,636 | Fábricas de Francia Chihuahua |
| 2001 | | Chihuahua | | Chih. | | Chihuahua Presidentes | 15,104 | Chihuahua |
| 2007 | | Chilpancingo | | Gro. | Galerías Chilpancingo | | 7,520 | |
| 2013 | | Ciudad del Carmen | | Camp. | Centro Comercial Zentralia Cd. del Carmen | Ciudad del Carmen | 9,355 | |
| 2009 | | Ciudad Juárez | | Chih. | Plaza Las Misiones | Ciudad Juárez Las Misiones | 11,937 | |
| 2002 | | Ciudad Obregón | | Son. | Plaza Tutuli | Ciudad Obregón | 6,447 | Fábricas de Francia Ciudad Obregón |
| 2010 | | Ciudad Victoria | | Tamps. | | Ciudad Victoria | 13,355 | |
| 1997 | | Coatzacoalcos | | Tab. | Forum Coatzacoalcos | Coatzacoalcos | 7,969 | Fábricas de Francia Coatzacoalcos |
| 2006 | | Coatzacoalcos | | Tab. | Plaza Crystal Coatzacoalcos | Coatzacoalcos Crystal | 13,124 | Coatzacoalcos |
| 2006 | | Colima | | Col. | Centro Comercial Zentralia Colima | Colima | 12,340 | |
| 2017 | | Comitán | | Chis. | Plaza Las Flores Comitan | Comitán | ? | Fábricas de Francia Comitán |
| 1997 | | Córdoba | | Ver. | Plaza Crystal Córdoba | Córdoba Crystal | 6,922 | Fábricas de Francia Córdoba |
| 2015 | | Cuautla | | Mor. | Plaza Los Atrios | Cuautla | 5,283 | Fábricas de Francia Cuautla |
| 2005 | | Cuernavaca | | Mor. | Galerías Cuernavaca | | 21,564 | |
| 2003 | | Culiacan | | Sin. | Forum Culiacán | Culiacán | 13,403 | |
| 2007 | | Durango | | Dgo. | Paseo Durango | Durango | 13,076 | |
| 2018 | | Fresnillo | | Zac. | Portal Fresnillo | Fresnillo | ? | |
| 2008 | | Guadalajara | Zapopan | Jal. | Andares | | 27,233 | |
| 2019 | | Guadalajara | Tlajomulco | Jal. | Galerías Santa Anita | | 34,000 | |
| 1999 | | Guadalajara | Zapopan | Jal. | Gran Plaza | | 10,235 | Fábricas de Francia Gdl. Gran Plaza |
| 1951 | | Guadalajara | Guadalajara | Jal. | | Guadalajara Centro | 8,275 | Fábricas de Francia Gdl. Centro |
| 2021-09-28 | | Guadalajara | Zapopan | Jal. | Distrito La Perla | La Perla | ? | |
| 2012 | | Guadalajara | Guadalajara | Jal. | Gran Terraza Oblatos | Oblatos Guadalajara | 16,892 | |
| 1974 | | Guadalajara | Zapopan | Jal. | Plaza Patria | | 8,641 | Fábricas de Francia Gdl. Plaza Patria |
| 2011 | | Guadalajara | Tlaquepaque | Jal. | Forum Tlaquepaque | Tlaquepaque | 17,468 | |
| 2003 | | Guadalajara | Zapopan | Jal. | Galerías Guadalajara | | 21,489 | |
| 2019 | | Guanajuato | | Gto. | Centro Comercial Alaïa Guanajuato | Guanajuato | 8,453 | |
| NEW | | Hermosillo | | Son. | Galerías Mall Sonora | | ? | |
| 2003 | | Hermosillo | | Son. | | Hermosillo Encinas | 12,572 | Hermosillo San Benito |
| 2016 | | Hermosillo | | Son. | Galerías Hermosillo | | 12,632 | |
| 2011 | | La Paz | | B.C.S. | | La Paz | 8,846 | |
| 2003 | | León | Irapuato | Gto. | Plaza Cibeles | Irapuato Plaza Cibeles | 14,649 | |
| 2012 | | León | col. Cerrito de Jerez | Gto. | Altacia | León Altacia | 17,850 | León Sur |
| 1996 | | León | col. Valle del Campestre | Gto. | Plaza Mayor | León Plaza Mayor | 13,950 | |
| 2008 | | Los Mochis | | Sin. | Paseo Los Mochis | Los Mochis | 8,925 | |
| 2013 | | Mazatlán | | Sin. | Galerías Mazatlán | Mazatlán | 14,000 | |
| 1963 | | Mazatlán | | Sin. | c/ Juárez y Cenizares | Mazatlán Centro | ? | Fábricas de Francia Mazatlán |
| 2018 | | Mérida | | Yuc. | La Isla Cabo Norte | Mérida La Isla Cabo Norte | ? | |
| 1999 | | Merida | | Yuc. | Galerías Mérida | Galerías Mérida | 15,367 | |
| 2013 | | Mexicali | | B.C. | | Mexicali | 12,800 | |
| 1934 | | Mexico City | Centro | CDMX | Ave. 20 de Septiembre | Centro | 12,965 | |
| 2012 | | Mexico City | Nezahualcóyotl | Edomex | Plaza Ciudad Jardín | Ciudad Jardín | 16,451 | |
| 2015 | | Mexico City | Coacalco | Edomex | Cosmopol | Coacalco | 15,237 | |
| 2005 | | Mexico City | Ecatepec | Edomex | Plaza Las Américas | Ecatepec | 20,895 | |
| 2008 | | Mexico City | Atizapán | Edomex | Galerías Atizapán | | 24,921 | |
| 1992 | | Mexico City | Villa Coapa, Tlalpan | CDMX | Galerías Coapa | | 21,830 | |
| 1962 | | Mexico City | Colonia Del Valle | CDMX | Galerías Insurgentes | | 30,301 | |
| 2000 | | Mexico City | Cuauhtitlán | Edomex | Galerías Perinorte | | 12,654 | |
| 2006 | | Mexico City | Col. Lindavista | CDMX | Parque Lindavista | Lindavista | 21,861 | |
| 2022 | | Mexico City | Colonia Xoco | CDMX | Mítikah | | 23,080 | |
| 2005 | | Mexico City | Colonia Piedad Narvarte | CDMX | Parque Delta | | 21,013 | |
| 2018 | | Mexico City | Iztapalapa | CDMX | Parque Las Antenas | | ? | |
| 2011 | | Mexico City | Interlomas, Huixquilucan | Edomex | Paseo Interlomas | | 24,037 | |
| 1980 | | Mexico City | Jardines del Pedregal | CDMX | Perisur | | 27,174 | |
| 1970 | | Mexico City | Polanco | CDMX | Calz. M. Escobedo | Polanco | 37,073 | |
| 1993 | | Mexico City | Santa Fe | CDMX | Centro Santa Fe | | 28,378 | |
| 1971 | | Mexico City | Ciudad Satélite | Edomex | Plaza Satélite | Satélite | 19,973 | |
| 2016 | | Mexico City | Tecámac | Edomex | Tecámac Power Center | Tecámac | 5,366 | Fábricas de Francia Mexico Tecamac |
| 2023 | | Mexico City | Gustavo A. Madero | CDMX | Parque Tepeyac | Tepeyac | 22,500 | |
| 2015 | | Mexico City | Tlalnepantla de Baz | Edomex | Plaza Tlalne Fashion Mall | Tlalnepantla | 19,595 | |
| 2017 | | Mexico City | Naucalpan | Edomex | Toreo Parque Central | Toreo | 20,000 | |
| 2019 | | Monclova | | Coahuila | | Liverpool Monclova | 10,979 | |
| 1983 | | Monterrey | | N.L. | Galerías Monterrey | | 19,335 | |
| 1999 | | Monterrey | | N.L. | | Monterrey Centro | 11,522 | |
| 2010 | | Monterrey | | N.L. | | Monterrey Cumbres | 16,723 | |
| 2019 | | Monterrey | | N.L. | Esfera Fashion Hall | Monterrey Esfera | 11,298 | |
| 2016 | | Monterrey | | N.L. | | Monterrey la Fe | 12,289 | |
| 2003 | | Monterrey | | N.L. | | Monterrey Valle | 17,170 | |
| 2010 | | Morelia | | Mich. | | Morelia Altozano | 16,240 | |
| 1979 | | Morelia | | Mich. | | Morelia Las Américas | 15,802 | |
| 2002 | | Oaxaca | | Oax. | | Oaxaca | 10,034 | Fábricas de Francia Oaxaca |
| 2017 | | Oaxaca | | Oax. | Plaza Bella | Oaxaca Plaza Bella | ? | Fábricas de Francia Oaxaca Plaza Bella |
| 2010 | | Orizaba | | Ver. | Plaza Valle | Orizaba | 13,359 | |
| 2003 | | Pachuca | | Hid. | Galerías Pachuca | Pachuca | 15,095 | |
| 2012 | | Playa del Carmen | | Q.R. | | Playa del Carmen | 9,222 | |
| 1997 | | Poza Rica | | Ver. | | Poza Rica | 5,567 | Fábricas de Francia Poza Rica |
| 2014 | | Puebla | | Pue. | Galerías Serdán | Galerías Serdán | 24,194 | Puebla Serdan |
| 2017 | | Puebla | | Pue. | Parque Puebla | Parque Puebla | ? | |
| 1997 | | Puebla | | Pue. | Angelópolis | Angelópolis | 30,986 | Puebla Angelópolis |
| 1997 | | Puebla | | Pue. | | Puebla Crystal | 6,186 | Fábricas de Francia Puebla |
| 2007 | | Puerto Vallarta | | Jal. | Galerías Puerto Vallarta | | 12,402 | |
| 2014 | | Querétaro | | Qro. | Antea | Liverpool Antea | 26,677 | |
| 2001 | | Querétaro | | Qro. | Galerías Querétaro | | 15,460 | |
| 2018 | | Querétaro | | Qro. | Paseo Querétaro | | ? | |
| 2015 | | Salamanca | | Gto. | | Salamanca | 5,721 | Fábricas de Francia Salamanca |
| 2012 | | Salina Cruz | | Oax. | | Salina Cruz | 9,189 | |
| 2008 | | Saltillo | | Coah. | Galerías Saltillo | | 14,477 | |
| 2012 | | San Juan del Río | | Qro. | Galerías San Juan del Rio | | 9,189 | |
| 2001 | | San Luis Potosí | | S.L.P. | | San Luis El Dorado | 15,372 | |
| 2011 | | San Luis Potosí | | S.L.P. | | San Luis Potosí | 15,000 | San Luis Potosí Carso |
| 2007 | | San Miguel de Allende | | Gto. | | San Miguel de Allende | 7,822 | |
| 1985 | | Tampico | | Tamps. | | Tampico | 15,375 | Tampico Country Club |
| 2016 | | Tampico | | Tamps. | | Tampico Altama | 19,469 | |
| 1999 | | Tapachula | | Chis. | | Tapachula | 7,496 | Fábricas de Francia Tapachula |
| 2006 | | Tehuacan | | Pue. | | Tehuacán | 7,562 | |
| 2007 | | Tepic | | Nay. | | Tepic | 14,293 | |
| 1961 | | Tepic | | Nay. | | Tepic Centro | 7,520 | Fábricas de Francia Tepic |
| 2023 | | Tijuana | | B.C. | Península | Tijuana | ? | |
| 2017 | | Tlaxcala | | Tlax. | | Tlaxcala | 15,759 | |
| 2014 | | Toluca | | Edomex | Galerías Toluca | | 24,344 | |
| 1998 | | Toluca | Metepec | Edomex | Galerías Metepec | | 14,324 | |
| 2001 | | Torreón | | Coah. | Galerías Laguna | Torreón | 13,680 | |
| 2013 | | Tuxpan | | Ver. | | Tuxpan | 12,800 | |
| 2017 | | Tuxtla Gutiérrez | | Chis. | | Tuxtla | 16,000 | Tuxtla Gutiérrez Ámbar |
| 1997 | | Tuxtla Gutiérrez | | Chis. | | Tuxtla Oriente | 11,356 | Tuxtla Gutiérrez Galerias |
| 2012 | | Veracruz | | Ver. | | Veracruz El Dorado | 23,455 | |
| 1997 | | Veracruz | | Ver. | | Veracruz Mocambo | 12,629 | Veracruz Las Americas |
| 2012 | | Villahermosa | | Tab. | | Altabrisa | 26,850 | |
| 1982 | | Villahermosa | Tabasco 2000^{(es)} | Tab. | Galerías Tabasco | | 15,092 | Tabasco 2000 |
| 1997 | | Villahermosa | | Tab. | Plaza Crystal | Villahermosa Crystal | 5,267 | Fábricas de Francia Villahermosa |
| 1997 | | Xalapa | | Ver. | Plaza Américas | Xalapa Plaza Américas | 6,660 | Fábricas de Francia Xalapa |
| 2006 | | Xalapa | | Ver. | Plaza Crystal | Xalapa | 21,178 | Xalapa |
| 2010 | | Zacatecas | | Zac. | Galerías Zacatecas | | 13,356 | |
| 2016 | | Zamora | | Mich. | Centro Comercial Sentura Zamora | Zamora | 8,933 | |
| 2006 | 2023 | Cancún | Zona Hotelera | Q.R. | La Isla Cancún | | 2,784 | |
| 1969 | 2021 | Guadalajara | Zapopan | Jal. | Plaza del Sol | | 8,255 | Fábricas de Francia Plaza del Sol |
| 2007 | 2022 | Mexico City | Iztapalapa | CDMX | Parque Tezontle | | 21,928 | |

Source: Tiendas ("Stores"), Liverpool website and p. 43, 2022 Annual Report

== Liverpool Interlomas Store ==
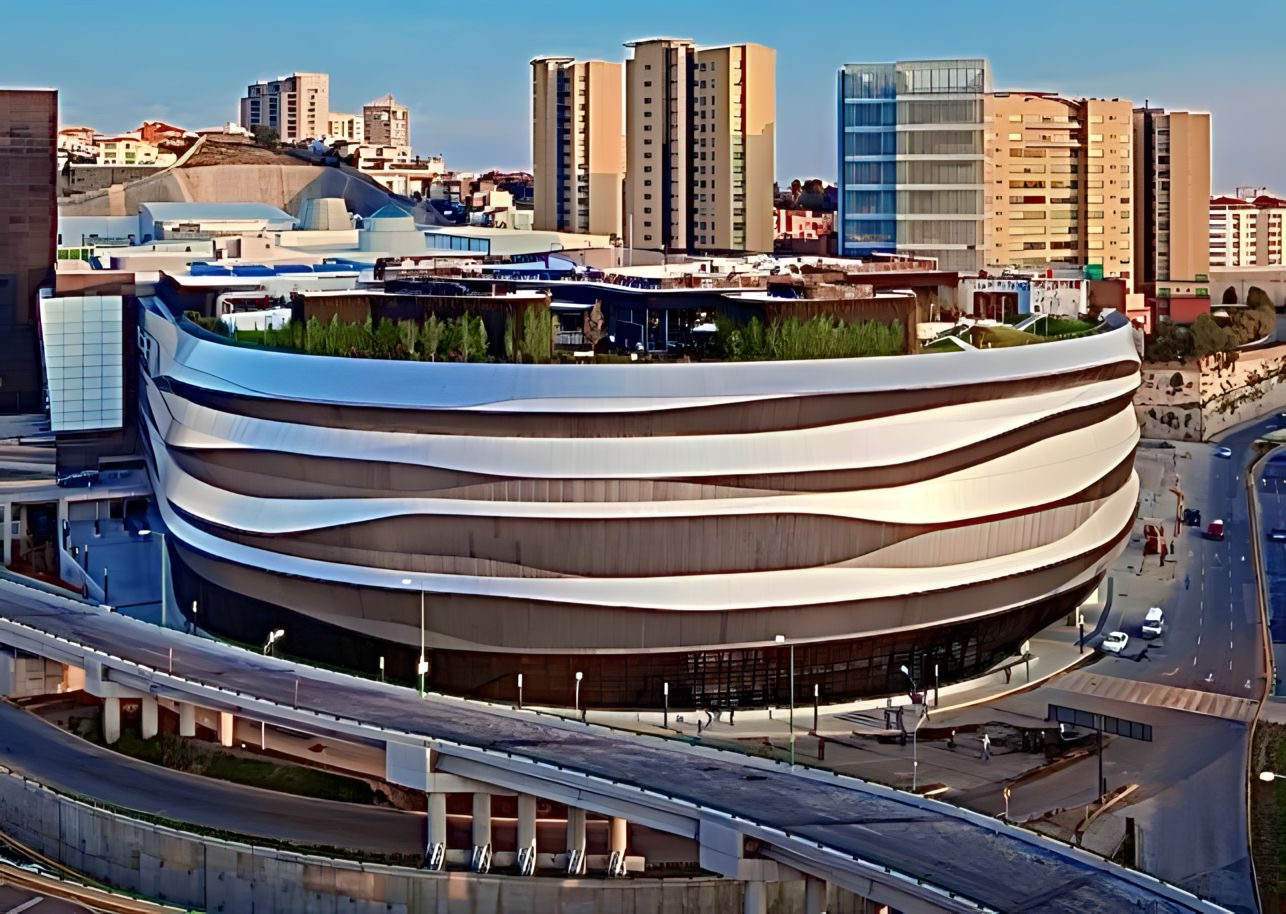
Liverpool Interlomas

In 2011, Liverpool opened a high-profile store at Paseo Interlomas, in the Interlomas, a major upscale suburban residential and business center in Greater Mexico City. The structure was designed by Rojkind Arquitectos. This three-story structure, dubbed the OVNI (UFO) for its distinctive metallic oval look, is clad in a double-layered stainless steel surface fabricated by Zahner. The 30,000m2 department store includes a rooftop recreational park. Several design firms were involved in various aspects of the project. The interiors were done by American architecture and design firm FRCH Design Worldwide, the rooftop garden by Thomas Balsley and the gourmet space by JHP Design.

== See also ==
- El Puerto de Liverpool, the corporate group of which Liverpool department stores are a part
- Galerías, shopping malls owned by El Puerto de Liverpool group
- Suburbia (department store)
- Barcelonnette department stores of Mexico
