= List of shopping malls in Mexico =

This is a list of shopping malls in Mexico, arranged by state.

Shopping centers in Mexico are classified into six different types:

- Super-regional shopping center with 90,000+ m^{2} gross leasable area (GLA). These typically have 3 or more full-line department store anchors (e.g. Liverpool, El Palacio de Hierro, Sears) and feature merchandise in the luxury, premium and AAA categories.
- Power center with 19,000–25,000 m^{2} GLA. Typically the largest anchors are Chedraui and Soriana supermarkets/hypermarkets; Walmart; and/or Sam's Club or Costco membership clubs.
- Fashion mall with 18,000–45,000 m^{2} GLA. These are typically focused on clothing and accessories, with no larger anchors other than a multicinema.
- Community shopping center with 9,000–45,000 m^{2} GLA. The largest anchors are typically supermarkets (e.g. Chedraui, la Cómer, Ley, Soriana, Sumesa, Superama), junior department stores (e.g. Suburbia, Sanborns, Coppel), and La Parisina; and multicinemas.
- Strip center with less than 7,500 m^{2} GLA, typically in L- or U-shape and with parking in front of the stores.
- Mixed shopping center with 3,000–30,000 m^{2} GLA exhibiting elements of the other formats.

== Aguascalientes ==
Aguascalientes

- Centro Comercial El Parián
- Altaria
- Galerías
- Velaria Mall
- El Dorado
- Espacio Aguascalientes

== Baja California ==
Ensenada

- Centro Comercial Misión
- Hussong's Plaza
- MacroPlaza Del Mar
- Plaza Bahia
- Plaza Caracol
- Plaza Marina
- Plaza Santa Lucía
- Plaza Transpeninsular

Mexicali

- Plaza Carranza
- Plaza Fiesta
- Plaza Fimbres
- Plaza Galerías del Valle
- Plaza La Cachanilla
- Plaza Lienzo
- Plaza Nuevo Mexicali
- Plaza San Pedro

Rosarito

- Pabellón Rosarito

Tecate

- Plaza Los Encinos

Tijuana

- Centro Comercial Minarete
- Centro Comercial Otay
- MacroPlaza Insurgentes
- Plaza Agua Caliente
- Plaza Americana Otay
- Plaza Carrousel
- Plaza Loma Bonita
- Plaza Monarca
- Plaza Papalote
- Plaza Pavilion
- Plaza Río Tijuana
- Plaza Sendero Tijuana
- Plaza Viva Tijuana

== Baja California Sur ==
Los Cabos

- Plaza Bonita Mall
- Puerto Paraiso

== Campeche ==
Campeche

- Antiques Imperio Arte Fino
- BIG HOME
- CITY CLUB
- City Fashion Mall
- City Mall
- Concentro
- Luxury Mall
- Mulbar
- Office Altabrisa
- Office Depot
- Office Max
- Offix
- Plaza Altamar
- Plaza Bodega Aurrera
- Plaza Campeche Luxury Fashion Mall
- Plaza Cenderos
- Plaza del Mar
- Plaza Handares
- Plaza Home Depot
- Plaza Liverpool
- Plaza Palacio de Hierro
- Plaza Sears - Campeche Centro
- Plaza Sears
- Plaza Paseo
- Plaza Soriana
- Plaza Suburbia
- Plaza Universidad
- Sam's Club

Cd. del Carmen

- Air Plaza
- Centro Comercial - Cd. del Carmen Galaxy
- Centro Comercial Chicago Carmen
- Centro Comercial Marshall
- Chedragui
- City Center
- City Mall Carmen
- CondoPlaza
- Gran Plaza
- Luxury Mall
- Mega Plaza
- Paseo del Carmen
- Plaza Arboledas
- Plaza Bodega Aurrera
- Plaza Bodega Aurrera - Cd. del Carmen Norte
- Plaza Bodega Aurrera - Cd. del Carmen Oriente
- Plaza Bodega Aurrera - Cd. del Carmen Perinorte
- Plaza Bodega Aurrera - Cd. del Carmen Perisur
- Plaza Bodega Aurrera - Cd. del Carmen Poniente
- Plaza Bodega Aurrera - Cd. del Carmen Sur
- Plaza Camichines
- Plaza Comercial Mexicana - Cd. del Carmen Centro I
- Plaza Comercial Mexicana - Cd. del Carmen Centro II
- Plaza Comercial Mexicana - Cd. del Carmen Centro III
- Plaza Comercial Mexicana - Cd. del Carmen Centro IV
- Plaza Comercial Mexicana - Cd. del Carmen Oriente
- Plaza Comercial Mexicana - Cd. del Carmen Poniente
- Plaza Comercial Mexicana - Cd. del Carmen Sur
- Plaza de la Luna
- Plaza de la Tecnología Carmen
- Plaza de las Americas
- Plaza del Angel
- Plaza Deli Luxury
- Plaza Delta
- Plaza Dorada
- Plaza Du Soleil
- Plaza Fernando
- Plaza Fernando Del Mar
- Plaza Fiesta
- Plaza Galerías
- Plaza Gualmar
- Plaza Heven
- Plaza Krystal Carmen
- Plaza Liverpool
- Plaza Luxury Mall
- Plaza Mercado Soriana - Cd. del Carmen Centro I
- Plaza Mercado Soriana - Cd. del Carmen Centro II
- Plaza Mercado Soriana - Cd. del Carmen Centro III
- Plaza Mercado Soriana - Cd. del Carmen Centro IV
- Plaza Mercado Soriana - Cd. del Carmen Oriente
- Plaza Mercado Soriana - Cd. del Carmen Poniente
- Plaza Mercado Soriana - Cd. del Carmen Sur
- Plaza Norte Carmen
- Plaza Onssa
- Plaza Palacio de Hierro
- Plaza Palmira
- Plaza Patria
- Plaza Pelicanos
- Plaza Presidentes
- Plaza Real
- Plaza Real de 14 Fashion Mall - Cd. del Carmen Bicenario
- Plaza San Isidro
- Plaza San Marcos
- Plaza Santa Fe Carmen
- Plaza Sears
- Plaza Sears - Cd. del Carmen II
- Plaza Sears - Cd. del Carmen III
- Plaza Soft Mall
- Plaza Soriana
- Plaza Suix
- Plaza Zentralia
- Plaza Universidad
- Plaza Vestir
- Punto Sao Paolo

== Chiapas ==
Comitán

- Plaza Las Flores

Ocosingo

- Plaza Toniná (under construction)

Reforma

- Plaza Reforma

San Cristóbal de Las Casas

- Plaza San Cristóbal

Tapachula

- Plaza Crystal
- Plaza Galerías Tapachula
- Plaza Patio
- Plaza Soriana

Tonalá

- Plaza Las Flores Tonalá

Tuxtla Gutiérrez

- Ámbar Fashion Mall - lifestyle center (2017)
- Plaza Arboria Park - town center
- Plaza Ambar - strip mall
- Plaza Baktún - town center
- Plaza Cedros - strip mall
- Plaza Crystal - community center
- Plaza Galerías Boulevard - fashion mall
- Plaza Jardines - town center
- Plaza Las Américas/Del Sol - community center
- Plaza Mirador - town center
- Plaza Poliforum - community center
- Plaza Regia - town center
- Plaza Santa Elena - town center (remodeling)

Villaflores

== Coahuila ==
Monclova

- Paseo Monclova

Ramos Arizpe

- Plaza Bella

Saltillo

- Galerias Saltillo
- Mi Plaza Mirasierra
- Plaza Nogalera
- Plaza Real Saltillo
- Plaza Sendero

Torreón

- Galerías Laguna
- Intermall
- Plaza Cuatro Caminos

== Colima ==
Colima

- Zentralía Colima (Fashion Mall)
- Plaza San Fernando (Fashion Mall)
- Plaza Country (Town Center)
- Laguna Shop (Town Center)
- Plaza San Carlos (Strip Center)
- Plaza Coliman (Power Center)

Villa de Álvarez

- Plaza Sendera (Lifestyle Center) Apertura el 9 de septiembre de 2021
- Plaza Colima (Power Center)
- Plaza Universidad (Strip Center)
- Plaza Rancagua (Strip Center)
- Patio Villa de Álvarez (Power Center)

Manzanillo

- Punto Bahia (Fashion Mall)
- Plaza Manzanillo (Community Center)
- Brizza Manzanillo Galería Comercial (Strip Center)
- Plaza Salagua (Power Center)
- Patio Manzanillo I (Power Center)
- Patio Manzanillo II (Power Center)

Tecomán

- Alameda Comercial Tecomán (Community Center)
- Plaza Caxitlán (Strip Center)
- Paseo Tecomán (Strip Center)

== Durango ==
Durango

- Paseo Durango

== Guanajuato ==
Celaya

- Galerías Tecnologico
- Parque Celaya
- Plaza Las Américas

Irapuato

- Plaza Fiesta
- Plaza Cibeles
- Plaza Jacarandas

León

- Centro Comercial Plaza Piel
- Centro Max
- Galerias Las Torres
- Plaza del Zapato
- Plaza Galerias
- Plaza Las Palmas
- Plaza Mayor (remodeling)
- Plaza Venecia

Salamanca

- VIA ALTA Salamanca

San Miguel de Allende

- Plaza la Luciérnaga

== Guerrero ==
Acapulco

- Galerías Diana
- La Isla Shopping Village
- Plaza Costera
- Plaza Dorada

Chilpancingo

- Galerias Chilpancingo
- Plaza Guerrero

Iguala

- Galerías Tamarindo

Ixtapa-Zihuatanejo

- La puerta Ixtapa
- Paseo Zihuatanejo

== Hidalgo ==
Pachuca

- Patio Pachuca
- Plaza Bella
- Plaza Galerias Pachuca
- Plaza Q
- Plaza Universidad
- Plaza Explanada Pachuca
- Parque Vértice Pachuca
- Plaza Revo
- Plaza Del Valle
- Vía Dorada
- Alta Plata

== Jalisco ==
Guadalajara

- Centro Magno (Town Center)
- Galería del Calzado (Community Center)
- Gran Terraza Oblatos (Fashion Mall) (anchors Liverpool, Cinépolis, Inditex, Soriana Híper and Office Depot)
- Midtown Jalisco (Town Center)
- Mulbar (Town Center)
- Plaza Alameda (Town Center)
- Plaza Bonita (Community Center)
- Plaza de la Computación (Town Center)
- Plaza Estadio (Power Center)
- Plaza Independencia (Community Center) (anchors Bodega Aurrerá, Cinépolis, Surtidora Departmental and Coppel)
- Plaza México (Community Center)
- Plaza Soriana Río Nilo (Power Center)
- Punto Sao Paulo (Town Center)
- Sania (Strip Mall)

Tlajomulco de Zuñiga

- Centrocity Santa Fe (Strip Mall)
- Galerías Santa Anita (Fashion Mall) (anchors Liverpool, Cinépolis, Suburbia, C&A and H&M)
- La Gourmetería (LifeStyle Center)
- Las Plazas Outlet Guadalajara (Fashion Mall)
- Multiplaza del Valle (Community Center)
- Plaza Chedraui Tlajomulco (Power Center)
- Plaza El Manantial (Strip Mall)
- Plaza El Palomar (Community Center)
- Plaza San Miguel (Strip Mall)
- Plaza Soriana Nueva Galicia (Power Center)
- Plaza Soriana San Agustín (Power Center)
- Plaza Soriana Santa Fe (Power Center)
- Plaza Vallarta (Strip Mall)
- Provenza Center (Strip Mall)
- Punto Sur (LifeStyle Center) (Inditex, Parisina, Cinépolis and Cuidado con el Perro)
- Urban Center Guadalajara (Strip Mall)

Tlaquepaque

- Centro Comercial Tlaquepaque (Power Center)
- Centro Sur (Fashion Mall)
- Espacio Tlaquepaque (Strip Mall)
- Forum Tlaquepaque (Fashion Mall) (anchors Liverpool, Cinépolis, Suburbia, C&A, Inditex, Office Max and Soriana Híper)
- Plaza Camichines (Community Center)
- Plaza de la Tecnología Centro Sur (Strip Mall)
- Plaza Las Fuentes (Community Center)
- Plaza Río Nilo Tlaquepaque (Community Center)

Tonalá

- Altea Río Nilo (Community Center)
- Plaza Lomas (Community Center) (anchors Chedraui, Cinemex, Suburbia and Famsa)
- Plaza Viva (Strip Mall)

Zapopan

- Andares (LifeStyle Center) (anchors El Palacio de Hierro, Liverpool, Inditex, Cinépolis VIP and H&M)
- Ciudadela (LifeStyle Center)
- Concentro (Town Center)
- CondoPlaza (Town Center)
- Distrito La Perla (Fashion Mall) (anchors Liverpool, Cinépolis, Inditex and H&M)
- Espacio Galerías (Community Center)
- Galerías Guadalajara (Fashion Mall) (anchors Liverpool, Sears, C&A, Sanborns, H&M, Inditex Cinépolis, Suburbia, Walmart and Sam's Club)
- Gran Terraza Belenes (Fashion Mall)
- La Gran Plaza Fashion Mall (Fashion Mall) (anchors Liverpool, Sears, C&A, Sanborns, Inditex and Cinépolis)
- The Landmark (Fashion Mall)
- Plaza Arboledas (Community Center)
- Plaza Aviación (Power Center)
- Plaza Bugambilias (Community Center)
- Plaza Cordilleras (Power Center)
- Plaza de la Luna (Strip Mall)
- Plaza del Angel (Community Center)
- Plaza del Sol (LifeStyle Center) (anchors Suburbia, Sanborns, Inditex, Soriana Híper and C&A)
- Plaza Milenium (Community Center)
- Plaza Pabellón (Fashion Mall)
- Plaza Patria (Fashion Mall)
- Plaza Presidentes (Strip Mall)
- Plaza San Isidro (Community Center)
- Plaza Sanzio (Strip Mall)
- Plaza VD Tesistán (Strip Mall)

Ameca

- Plaza Tulipanes Ameca
- Soriana Express Ameca

Arandas

- Plaza Tulipanes
- Poliplaza

Atotonilco El Alto

- Plaza Comercial Del Valle

Autlán de Navarro

- Galerías Metropolitana Autlán (Cinépolis 5 cinemas and Soriana Express)
- Plaza Cantabria Autlán
- Plaza Catedral
- Plaza del Valle
- Plaza Imperial
- Plaza Vista del Sol

Chapala

- Ajijic Center
- Centro Laguna
- Plaza Las Flores
- Plaza Interlago
- Plaza Soriana Chapala
- Walmart Ajijic Chapala

Ciudad Guzmán

- Mi Centro Ciudad Guzmán (Power Center) (Cinépolis, Coppel, Elektra, CONVERSE, First Cash and others)
- Paseo La Feria (Strip Mall) (Liverpool Express, Café La Flor de Córdoba, Helados Dolphy, AirePAZ Chocolatería, Quilombo Cocina de Barrio, Zapatería Espinosa 3 Distribuidora Autorizada de Cuadra and others)
- Plaza Soriana Cd. Guzmán (Power Center) (Cinemex, Soriana Mercado, Coppel and LONG HANG)
- Plaza Zapotlán (Community Center) (Soriana Mercado [initially Gigante], Farmacias Guadalajara, AirePaz Chocolatería, Zapatería Espinosa 3 Distribuidora Autorizada de Cuadra and La Marina, among others)
- Plaza CompuCenter Cd. Guzmán (Technology plaza)

El Grullo

- Plaza Las Grullas
- Plaza Santa Fe

Lagos de Moreno

- Plaza Capuchinas
- Plaza Soriana Lagos de Moreno
- Portal Lagos de Moreno

Ocotlán

- Plaza Los Pirules
- Plaza San Felipe
- Plaza Soriana Ocotlán

Puerto Vallarta

- Galerías Vallarta
- La Isla Shopping Village
- Macro Plaza Vallarta
- Plaza Caracol
- Plaza Neptuno
- Plaza Marina
- Plaza Península
- Plaza Soriana Pitillal

San Juan de los Lagos

- Argania Centro Comercial
- Bodega Aurrerá San Juan de los Lagos
- Plaza Juárez
- Plaza San Juan

Sayula

- Plaza Sayula (Cinépolis 5 cinemas and Vancouver Wings)
- Mi Bodega Aurrerá Sayula (Mi Bodega Aurrerá)
- Soriana Express Sayula (Soriana Express)
- Centro Regional de Comercio Sayula

Tala

- Plaza Gardenia
- Soriana Express Tala (Soriana Express)

Tepatitlán de Morelos

- Centro Comercial Capilla de Guadalupe (Community Center) (Capilla de Guadalupe)
- Punto La Gloria (Strip Mall) (Tepatitlán de Morelos)
- Plaza Carnicerito (Strip Mall) (Tepatitlán de Morelos)
- Plaza Galerías Tepatitlán (Community Center) (Tepatitlán de Morelos)
- Plaza Los Altos (Community Center) (Tepatitlán de Morelos)
- Plaza Soriana Tepatitlán (Power Center) (Tepatitlán de Morelos)
- Plaza Villalta (Strip Mall) (Tepatitlán de Morelos)
- Plaza Punto Vizcaya (Strip Mall Express) (Tepatitlán de Morelos)
- Plaza San Jorge (Strip Mall Express) (Tepatitlán de Morelos)

Tequila

- Coppel Tequila Jalisco (Power Center) (Coppel and Farmacias Guadalajara)
- Mi Bodega Aurrerá Tequila Jalisco (Power Center) (Mi Bodega Aurrerá)
- Plaza Ubika Tequila (Power Center) (Farmacias Benavides, Pizza Hut, First Cash and Sukarne)

Villa Hidalgo

- Centro Comercial Ámbar
- Centro Comercial GUSOGA Center (Chedraui, Cinépolis, residential areas, Hotel, Casino, and more)
- Centro Comercial Villa Textil
- Las Palmas Centro Comercial
- Mi Bodega Aurrerá Villa Hidalgo (Mi Bodega Aurrerá)
- Plaza JP
- Villa del Sol

Zacoalco de Torres

- Mi Bodega Aurrerá Zacoalco de Torres (Mi Bodega Aurrerá)

== Mexico City ==
See also State of Mexico

=== Álvaro Obregón borough ===
Jardines del Pedregal

- Artz Pedregal, mixed-use, 65,000 square metres (700,000 sq ft) of commercial space, total of 400,000 square metres (4,300,000 sq ft) incl. offices and park, anchors include Cinemex. Luxury boutiques.
- Perisur (anchors include Liverpool, El Palacio de Hierro, Sears), 113,000 square metres (1,220,000 sq ft) gross leasable area

San Ángel

- Altavista 147
- Portal San Ángel (anchors include Sears, Sam's Club, Walmart, Cinépolis)

Las Águilas

- Portal Centenario - anchors include Walmart, Suburbia, Starbucks, Office Depot, Coppel, Cinépolis

=== Azcapotzalco borough ===
- Parque Vía Vallejo, 81,788 square metres (880,360 sq ft) gross leasable area (anchors include Sears, Soriana, Sanborns, Suburbia)

=== Benito Juárez borough ===
- Galerías Insurgentes and adjacent freestanding Liverpool, Colonia del Valle
- Manacar, colonia Insurgentes Mixcoac, 25,000 square metres (270,000 sq ft) of gross leasable commercial space
- Centro Coyoacán (colonia Xoco, anchors include El Palacio de Hierro which will close in 2022 and move to Mítikah)
- Mítikah (colonia Xoco, opening late 2022, anchors will include El Palacio de Hierro and Liverpool); 120,000 square metres (1,300,000 sq ft) of commercial space in a 1,000,000-square-metre (11,000,000 sq ft) mixed-use complex
- Metrópoli Patriotismo, colonia San Pedro de los Pinos, opened 2006, 120,000 square metres (1,300,000 sq ft) of gross leasable area, anchors include Cinemex
- Parque Delta, colonia Piedad Narvarte, anchors include Liverpool), 70,224 square metres (755,880 sq ft) gross leasable area
- Plaza Universidad, colonia Santa Cruz Atoyac, opened 1969, the city's first mall, anchors include Sears, 30,569 square metres (329,040 sq ft) of gross leasable area
- World Trade Center Mexico City, colonia Nápoles (anchors include Sears, Cinemex)

=== Cuajimalpa borough ===
Col. Cuajimalpa

- Plaza Cuajimalpa (anchors include Suburbia, Walmart)
- Plaza Vista Hermosa (Office Depot, Petco, Waldo's)
- Shops Cuajimalpa (a.k.a. Plaza Real, anchors include Coppel)

Santa Fe incl. col. Zedec Santa Fe

- Centro Santa Fe, anchors include El Palacio de Hierro, Liverpool, Sears, Casa Palacio, 210,400 square metres (2,265,000 sq ft) gross leasable area
- City Walk
- Garden Santa Fe^{(es)} underground mall
- Patio Santa Fe (anchors include Walmart, Sam's Club, The Home Depot, Office Depot, Petco, Sportium gym, Cinépolis)
- Samara Shops (anchors include Cinépolis)

=== Cuauhtémoc borough ===
Col. Buenavista

- Forum Buenavista (anchors include Sears, Fábricas de Francia, Coppel), 37,250 square metres (401,000 sq ft) gross leasable commercial area

Centro (Historic Center)

- Barrio Alameda
- Liverpool historic flagship
- El Palacio de Hierro historic flagship
- Parque Alameda
- Sears freestanding store, Avenida Juárez

Condesa

- Espacio Condesa (mixed-use, anchors include Cinépolis and Petco), 23,527 sqm gross leasable area

Col. Roma Norte

- Pabellón Cuauhtémoc
- El Palacio de Hierro freestanding store
- El Parián (historic shopping arcade)
- Plaza Insurgentes (anchors include Sears, Cinemex)

Zona Rosa, Colonia Juárez

- Plaza Jacaranda (defunct, historically significant)
- Plaza la Rosa
- Reforma 222 (anchors include Cinemex, Sanborns)

=== Gustavo A. Madero borough ===
In Lindavista:

- Parque Lindavista (anchors include Cinemex, Sanborns)
- Plaza Lindavista (anchors include Sears)
- Plaza Torres Lindavista (anchors include Suburbia and Walmart)

In Tepeyac:

- Parque Tepeyac, opened 2023, 90,000 square metres (970,000 sq ft) GLA, anchors include Cinépolis, Coppel, Liverpool, Petco, Sears and Suburbia

=== Iztapalapa borough ===
- Plaza Central (anchors include Coppel, Elektra)
- Parque Las Antenas (anchors include Liverpool, Sanborns, Sears, Cinépolis)
- Plaza Oriente (anchors include Suburbia, Walmart)
- Plaza Tezontle (anchors include Sears)

=== Miguel Hidalgo borough ===
Bosques de las Lomas

- Paseo Arcos Bosques

Las Lomas (col. Lomas de Chapultepec)

- Carso Palmas
- Lomas Plaza

Polanco and Nuevo Polanco (col. Granada, col. Irrigación)

- Antara Polanco (anchors include Casa Palacio)
- Centro Comercial Polanco, Avenida Miguel de Cervantes (anchors include Costco)
- Galerías Polanco, Avenida Horacio (anchors include West Elm)
- Liverpool Mariano Escobedo
- Miyana
- Pabellón Polanco (anchors include Sears)
- El Palacio de Hierro flagship "El Palacio de los Palacios"
- Parques Polanco (mixed-use complex)
- Pasaje Polanco, historic shopping arcade
- Plaza Carso (includes Teatro Telcel, City Market, former Saks Fifth Avenue location)

Colonia Verónica Anzures

- Plaza de las Estrellas

=== Tlalpan borough ===
Coapa

- Galerías Coapa (anchors include Liverpool and Sears)
- Paseo Acoxpa (anchors include Best Buy, Boutique Palacio and Casa Palacio)

=== Venustiano Carranza borough ===
- Encuentro Oceanía (anchors include IKEA), 75,000 square meters (810,000 sq ft) gross leasable area
- Plaza Aeropuerto
- VIA 515, Iztacalco

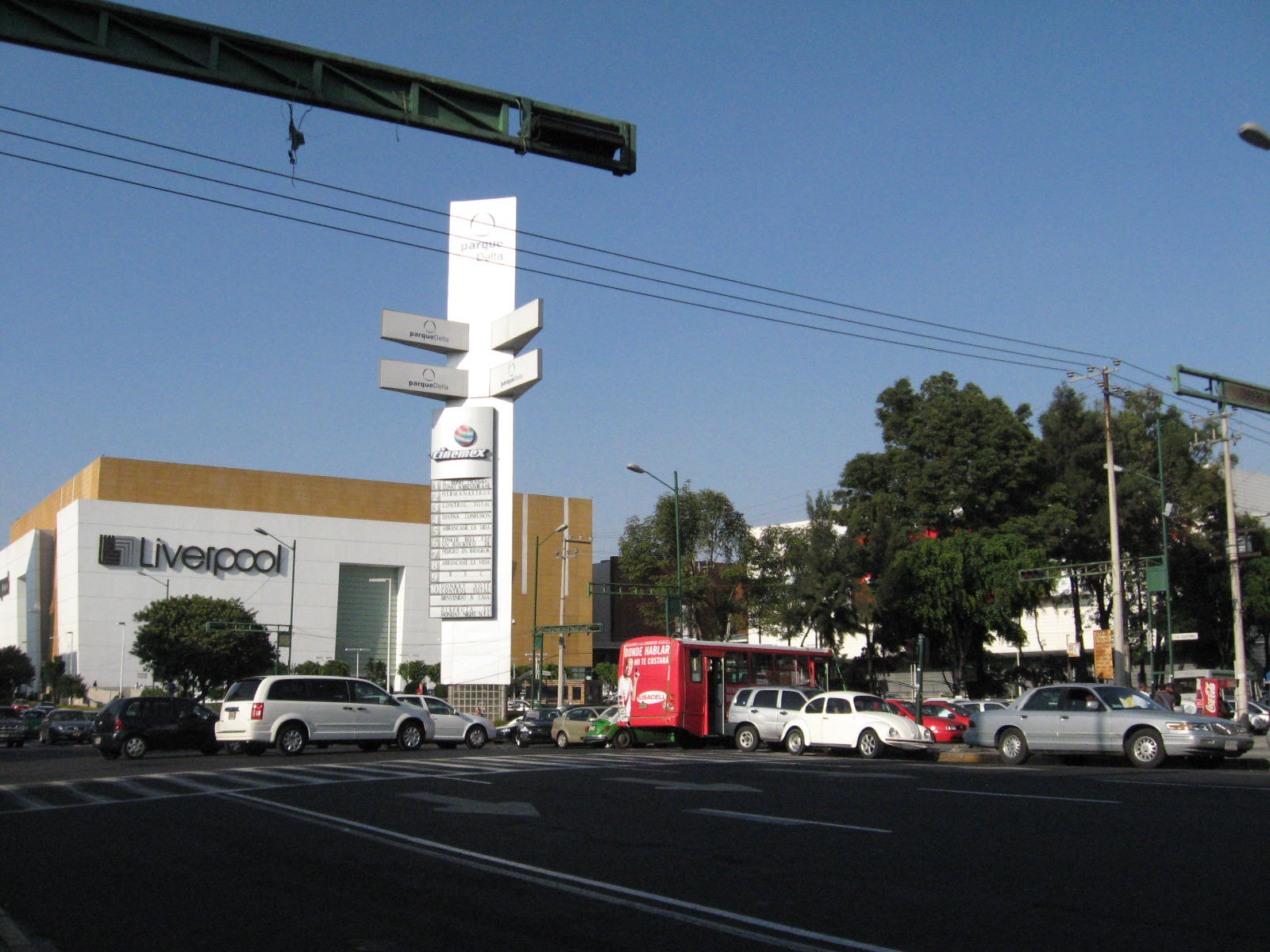
The Parque Delta mall, 2008

== State of Mexico ==
Atizapán de Zaragoza

- Bosque Esmeralda
- Espacio Esmeralda
- Galerias Atizapán (anchors include Liverpool and Sears)
- Luna Parc

Chimalhuacan

- Plaza Chimalhuacan (anchors include Sears)

Coacalco de Berriozabal

- Coacalco Power Center
- Cosmopol (anchors include Liverpool, Sears)
- Plaza Coacalco
- Plaza Las Flores (anchors include Home Depot, Sams Club, Soriana, Suburbia, Walmart)
- Plaza Zentralia Coacalco (anchors include Sears)

Cuautitlán Izcalli

- Centro San Miguel
- Luna Parc Cuautitlán Izcalli (anchors include Sears, Sanborns, Cinépolis, Star Médica hospital)
- Multiplaza Izacalli
- Galerías Perinorte
- Plaza San Marcos and San Marcos Power Center
- Punta Norte

Ecatepec

- Centro Las Américas (anchors include Liverpool, Sears, Suburbia, Coppel, Cinépolis, Sanborns)
- Multiplaza Aragón, anchors include: Walmart, Sam's Club, Bodega Aurrerá, Suburbia, Coppel, Cinépolis; 138,304 square metres (1,488,690 sq ft) gross leasable area

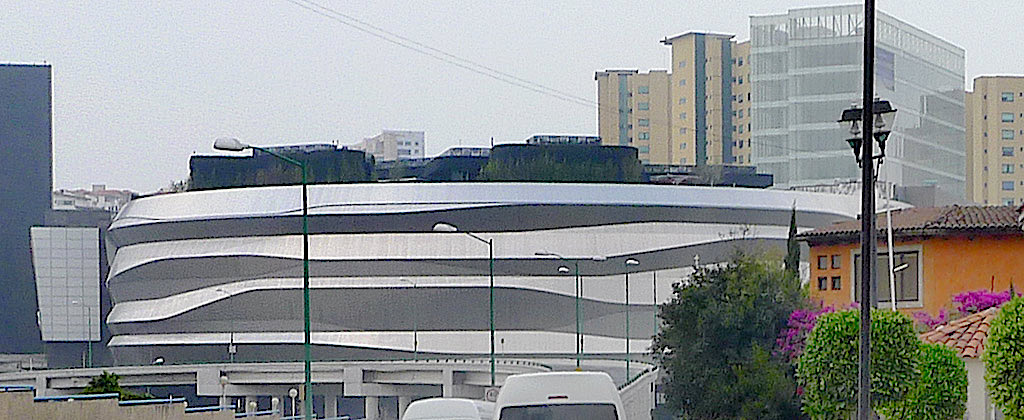
Liverpool department store at Paseo Interlomas mall

Huixquilucan (area including Interlomas)

- Centro Comercial Interlomas (anchors include Chedraui, Innovasport, Sanborns, Cinépolis)
- Magnocentro (anchors include City Market, Decathlon, Home Depot, Walmart)
- Espacio Interlomas (anchors include SportsWorld, Superama)
- La Piazza
- Paseo Interlomas, anchors include Liverpool, Palacio de Hierro, Sears; 73,965 square metres (796,150 sq ft) gross leasable area

Las Aguilas

- Plaza Axomiatla
- Plaza Las Águilas

Lerma

- Las Plazas Outlet

Metepec

- Galerías Metepec
- Plaza las Américas
- Plaza la Pilita
- Plaza Mía
- Pabellón Metepec
- Paseo Metepec
- Town Square Metepec

Naucalpan incl. Ciudad Satélite

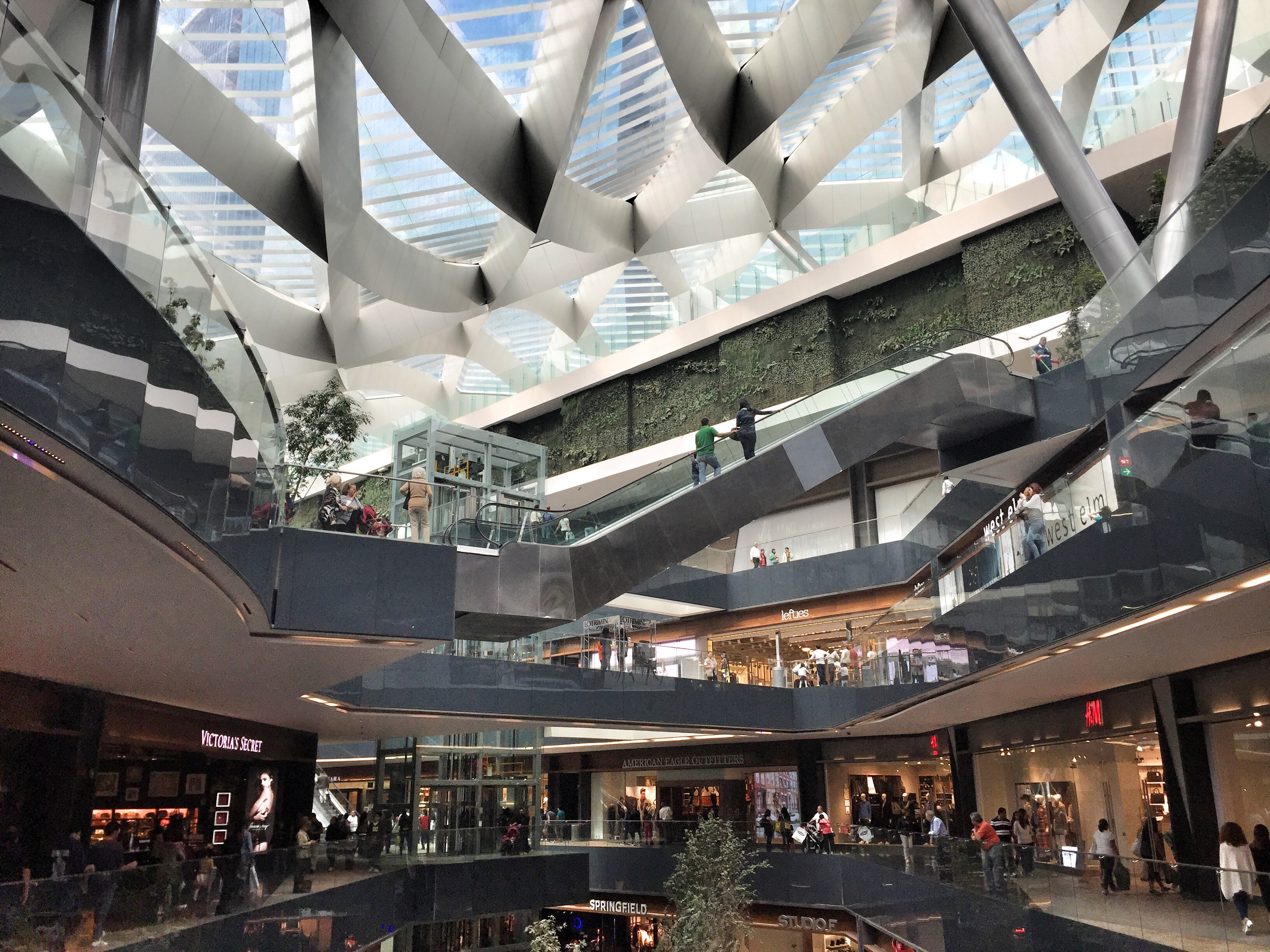
Interior of Toreo Parque Central

- La Cúspide Sky Mall - Lomas Verdes (anchors include Sam's Club, Walmart)
- Mexipuerto Cementos Fortaleza Cuatro Caminos (transit terminal, residential, sports and shopping complex; anchors include Sears, Sanborns, Cinemex) 31,549 square metres (339,590 sq ft) of commercial gross leasable area
- Mundo E
- Plaza Satélite, anchors include Costco, Liverpool, Palacio de Hierro, Sears, La Parisina, Cinépolis; 180,000 square metres (1,900,000 sq ft) gross leasable area
- Toreo Parque Central, 90,000 square metres (970,000 sq ft) gross leasable area

Ciudad Nezahualcóyotl

- Centro Comercial Ciudad Jardín
- Plaza Ciudad Jardín (anchors include Liverpool, Sears, Suburbia, Cinépolis)

Ciudad Nicolás Romero

- Town Center Nicolás Romero (anchors include Suburbia, Sam's Club, Walmart)

Tecamac

- Macroplaza Tecámac
- Plaza Tecámac/Tecámac Power Center (anchors include Home Depot, Liverpool, Walmart)

Tlalnepantla

- Multiplaza Arboledas (anchors include Suburbia
- Multiplaza Valle Dorado
- Plaza Tlalne Fashion Mall (anchors include Liverpool, Sears)

Toluca

- Galerías Toluca
- Plaza Lerma
- Plaza Toluca

== Michoacán ==
Apatzingán

- Paseo Akia (Community Center) (Cinépolis, Starbucks, Coppel, Red Hot Wings)

La Piedad

- NEA Shopping Center (Fashion Mall) (Walmart, SAM'S CLUB, Promoda, Burger King and Cinemex)
- Plaza Galerías del Río (Power Center) (Soriana Mercado, Cinépolis, Elektra and Telcel)

Lázaro Cárdenas

- Plaza Las Américas (Community Center) (Walmart, SAM'S CLUB, Office Depot, Cinépolis, Mc. Donald's, Starbucks, GOC Make Up, Promoda, Liverpool Express and Coppel Canadá)
- Plaza Soriana Lázaro Cárdenas (Power Center) (Soriana Mercado, Coppel and Cinemex)

Morelia

- Espacio Las Américas (Fashion Mall): Anchors Bed Bath & Beyond, C&A, Cinépolis, Cinépolis VIP, Liverpool, Sears, Sanborns, Zara.
- Escala Morelia: Anchors Bol Plaza, Cinépolis, La Comer, Nike Factory Store, Palacio del Arte, Sushi Factory, Yak Casino.
- Plaza Fiesta Camelinas: Anchors Bodega Aurrerá.
- Escala La Huerta (Power Center): Anchors Cinépolis, Italianni's, Jiménez, Promoda, The Home Depot, Walmart.
- Serviplaza Morelia Rio: Anchors Cinépolis, Smart Fit, Soriana Híper.
- Paseo Altozano (Fashion Mall): Anchors Cinelia, Crown City, Distrito 30&2, Fiesta Inn, GoKartManía, H&M, Liverpool, Monkey, Sanborns, Sears, Selecto Súper Chedraui.
- Macro Plaza Estadio: Anchors Cinemex, Walmart.
- Plaza El Prado: Anchors Cinépolis, Elektra, Modatelas, Soriana Mercado.
- Andador Morelia: Anchors Cinemex, Smart Fit.
- Plaza Paseo Poniente: Anchors Cinépolis, Seven Days Express.

Sahuayo

- Plaza Feria (Community Center) (Bodega Aurrerá, Cinépolis, Little Caesars, McDonalds, Subway, Elektra, among others)

Uruapan

- Ágora Uruapan (Community Center) (Walmart, SAM'S CLUB, Suburbia, Cinépolis, Toks, Starbucks, Flexi, C&A and Miniso)
- Plaza Galerías Metropolitana Uruapan (Power Center) (Soriana Híper [initially Soriana Mercado], Cinépolis, Elektra, The Home Depot, Little Caesar's Pizza, Coppel and Promoda)
- Plaza Soriana Uruapan (Power Center) (Soriana Híper and Coppel Canada)

Zacapu

- Galerías Zacapu (Community Center) Under construction (CineBox)

Zamora

- Sentura Zamora (Fashion Mall) (Liverpool, Suburbia, Cinépolis, Rebel Wings, Coppel Canada, Telcel, AT&T, LOB, LOB Footwear, Shasa, GOC Make Up, STOP, and Urban Store, InnovaSport [Soon])
- Plaza Ana (Community Center) (Walmart [before Gigante], Farmacias Guadalajara, GongCha, Coppel and Cinépolis)
- Plaza Las Palomas (Power Center) (Soriana Híper [before Comercial Mexicana], Little Caesar's Pizza, Telcel, AT&T, Honda MOTORS, and Santa Clara)
- Plaza Zamora (Downtown) (Woolworth, Coppel, Elektra, La Marina Navieri and Merza, among others)
- Mercado Soriana (Power Center) (Soriana Mercado, DHL)
- Plaza Ventanas (Plaza del Sol) (Power Center) (McDonald's Farmacias Del Ahorro)
- Paseo Zamora (Power Center) (Cinemex, AutoZone, GM MOTORS, Smart Fit and Office Depot)

Zitácuaro

- Grand Plaza Los Soles (Fashion Mall) (Suburbia, Nutrisa, Liverpool Express and Cinépolis)

== Morelos ==
Cuernavaca

- Galerías Cuernavaca
- Plaza Cuernavaca
- Forum Cuernavaca
- Averanda
- Portal D10

Jiutepec

- Plaza Cibeles
- Plaza Cedros

Cuautla

- Plaza Atrios

== Nayarit ==
Tepic

- Forum Tepic (Fashion & LifeStyle Mall)
- Centro Histórico de Tepic (Downtown)
- Plaza Alica (Community Center)
- Walmart Tepic (Power Center)
- Plaza J&K (Strip Mall)
- Plaza Cigarrera (Power Center)
- Plaza La Loma (Community Center)
- Plaza Galerías del Valle (LifeStyle Center)
- Manglar Shopping Center (Strip Mall)
- Plaza La Cantera (Power Center)
- POP Plaza Gourmet (Gourmet Mall)
- Plaza Ubika (Strip Mall)
- Practiplaza Oriente (Strip Mall)
- Plaza Las Flores Tepic (Strip Mall)

Nuevo Vallarta

- Paradise Mall (Fashion Mall)
- Plaza El Faro (Community Center)
- Centro Comercial Lago Real (Community Center)
- Plaza Soriana Nuevo Vallarta (Power Center)
- LaComer Nuevo Vallarta (Power Center)
- Plaza Chedraui Nuevo Vallarta (Power Center)
- Plaza Chedraui Bucerías (Power Center)
- Plaza Bahía (Strip Mall)
- Plaza Parabién (Strip Mall)
- Practiplaza Oriente (Strip Mall)
- Plaza Las Palmas San Vicente (Strip Mall)
- Mi Bodega Aurrerá San José del Valle (Power Center)
- Ley San José del Valle (Power Center)
- Soriana Express San Vicente Bahía de Banderas (Power Center)

Acaponeta

- Paseo Gardenia (Strip Mall)
- Mi Bodega Aurrerá Acaponeta (Power Center)
- Soriana Acaponeta (Power Center)

== Nuevo León ==
Apodaca

- Centro Comercial Sendero Apodaca

Ciudad Juárez

- Sun Mall Juárez

Escobedo

- Centro Comercial Sendero

Guadalupe

- Multiplaza Lindavista
- Sun Mall Guadalupe

Monterrey

- Centro Comercial San Roque
- Centro Comercial Sendero Lincoln
- Galerías Monterrey
- Interplaza Shoptown
- Multiplaza Lincoln
- Plaza Adana
- Plaza Cumbres
- Plaza Fiesta San Agustín
- Plaza Gran Patio
- Plaza México

San Nicolás de los Garza

- Citadel Monterrey
- Plaza Fiesta Anáhuac

San Pedro Garza García

- Galerías Valle Oriente
- Mall del Valle
- Paseo San Pedro
- Plaza San Pedro

== Puebla ==
Puebla

- Angelópolis Mall
- Centro Comercial Cruz del Sur
- Centro Comercial La Noria
- Centro Comercial Milenium (closed)
- Centro Comercial Plaza Dorada
- Centro Comercial El Triangulo
- Galeria las Animas
- Galerias Serdan
- Outlet Puebla Premier
- Palmas Plaza
- Parque Puebla
- Paseo San Francisco
- Periplaza
- Plaza America
- Plaza Centro Sur
- Plaza Crystal
- Plaza Las Torres
- Plaza Loreto
- Plaza San Angel
- Plaza San Antonio
- Plaza San Diego
- Plaza San Jose
- Plaza San Pedro
- Plaza Victoria
- Puebla Hermanos Serdan
- Servi Plaza

Tehuacan

- Centro Comercial El Paseo Tehuacan
- Plaza Tehuacan

Other

- Plaza Crystal - Teziutlan

== Querétaro ==
Santiago de Querétaro

- Antea
- Galerías Querétaro
- Plaza Boulevares
- Plaza Constituyentes
- Plaza de las Americas
- Plaza del Parque
- Plaza El Puente
- Plaza Galerías Constituyentes
- Plaza Korfu
- Plaza Maravillas Tlacote
- Plaza Sendero
- Urban Center Jurica
- Urban Center Juriquilla

== Quintana Roo ==
Cancún

- Cancún Mall
- Centro Comercial la Isla
- Flamingo Plaza
- Kukulcán Plaza
- La Gran Plaza Cancún
- Paseo Cancún
- Plaza Caracol
- Plaza Las Américas (Cancún) and Malecón Américas (anchors include Chedraui, Liverpool, Sears)
- Plaza Mendez

Chetumal

- Plaza Las Américas

Cozumel

- Centro Comercial Punta Langosta
- Terminal Marítima Puerto Maya

Playa del Carmen

- Centro Maya
- Plaza Las Américas

== San Luis Potosí ==
San Luis Potosí

- Plaza Citadella
- Plaza Chapultepec 1200
- Plaza El Dorado
- Plaza Fiesta
- Plaza San Luis
- Plaza Sendero
- Plaza Tangamanga
- Soriana El Paseo

== Sinaloa ==
Culiacán

- Forum Mall
- Galerías San Miguel
- Explanada Culiacán
- Ceiba
- Plaza Sendero
- Mi Plaza Barrancos
- Mi Plaza Abastos
- Plaza Culiacán
- Plaza Comercial La Campiña

Los Mochis

- Paseo Mochis
- Plaza Sendero
- Punto Los Mochis
- Plaza Fiesta Las Palmas

Mazatlán

- La Gran Plaza Mazatlán
- Galerías Mazatlán
- Acaya Mazatlán
- Plaza Soriana Insurgentes
- Plaza Santa Rosa
- Plaza Soriana Rafael Buelna
- Plaza Soriana Toreo
- Plaza del Mar
- Paseo Bicentenario
- Ley Valle Dorado

== Sonora ==
Hermosillo

- Plaza Sendero
- Plaza Sahuaro
- Galerías Mall
- Pabellón Reforma
- Colossus Corporate Center and Plaza
- Plaza Andenes Hermosillo
- Metrocentro

Ciudad Obregón

- Plaza Tutúli
- Plaza Sendero

== Tamaulipas ==
Altamira

- Plaza Comercial SunMall

Nuevo Laredo

- Paseo Reforma
- Plaza Soriana Reforma

Matamoros

- Plaza Fiesta
- Plaza Sendero

Reynosa

- Plaza del Rio
- Plaza Periférico
- Plaza Real

Tampico

- Plaza Comercial SunMall
- Plaza Comercial Tres Arcos
- Plaza Sendero
- Shopping Tampico

Victoria

- Paseo Aventa

== Tlaxcala ==
Tlaxcala

- Gran Patio Tlaxcala
- Galerias Tlaxcala
- Soriana - Plaza Inn
- Soriana - Plaza Tlaxcala

== Veracruz ==
Acayucan

- Plaza La Florida

Boca del Río

- Plaza Américas
- Plaza Mocambo
- Plaza El Dorado
- Plaza Andamar
- Urban Center Boca del rio
- Plaza Exprés Las Palmas
- Plaza Santa Ana
- Plaza Soriana Boca del Río
- Plaza Río
- Plaza Veleros
- Portal Conchal

Coatepec

- Plaza Crystal

Coatzacoalcos

- Forum Coatzacoalcos
- Plaza Acaya
- Plaza Crystal
- Plaza El Palmar
- Plaza Quadrum
- Plaza El Dorado
- Plaza Teatro
- Plaza San Javier

Córdoba

- Plaza Crystal
- Plaza Shangri-La

Martinez de la Torre

- Plaza Crystal

Minatitlan

- Via Plaza
- Plaza Crystal

Orizaba

- Plaza Valle Orizaba
- Plaza Faro
- Plaza O

Poza Rica

- Gran Patio Poza Rica
- Plaza Crystal Poza Rica
- Plaza Soriana Poza Rica

San Andrés Tuxtla

- Plaza Urban
- Centro Comercial La Fuente

Tierra Blanca

- Plaza Comercial La Novia del Sol

Tuxpan

- Plaza Crystal Tuxpan
- Gran Patio Tuxpan

Veracruz

- Plaza Crystal
- Plaza Zaragoza
- Plaza Palmas
- Plaza Los Pinos
- Plaza Tokyo
- Plaza Tec
- Servi Plaza Floresta
- Plaza del Puerto (Plaza las Brisas)
- Plaza Puerto Caoba
- Plaza Isla Bella
- Plaza Corales
- Plaza El Coyol
- Plaza Coyol Laguna
- Diverplaza Río Medio
- Portal Veracruz

Xalapa

- Plaza Américas
- Plaza Crystal
- Plaza Las Animas
- Plaza Museo
- Plaza Paseo Jardines
- Plaza El Juguete
- Urban Center Xalapa

== Yucatán ==
Mérida

- City Center Caucel - power center
- City Center Mérida - neighborhood shopping center
- Galerías Mérida - fashion mall
- Interplaza Las Palmas - power center
- Macroplaza Mérida - power center
- Plaza Altabrisa - fashion mall
- Plaza Buenavista - power center
- Plaza Canek - power center
- Plaza Crystal - power center
- Plaza Dorada - power center
- Plaza Fiesta - power center
- Plaza Las Américas - power center
- Plaza Oriente - power center
- Sendero Mérida - power center

Motul

- Plaza Oasis

Progreso

- Plaza del Mar - power center
- Plaza Mirvana - Ticul

Valladolid

- Plaza Bella - power center
