= Pariani =

Pariani is a surname. Notable people with the surname include:

- Alberto Pariani (1876–1955), Italian general
- Brian Pariani (born 1965), American football coach
- Gino Pariani (1928–2007), American soccer player

== See also ==
- Parian (disambiguation)
