= Angelópolis (Puebla) =

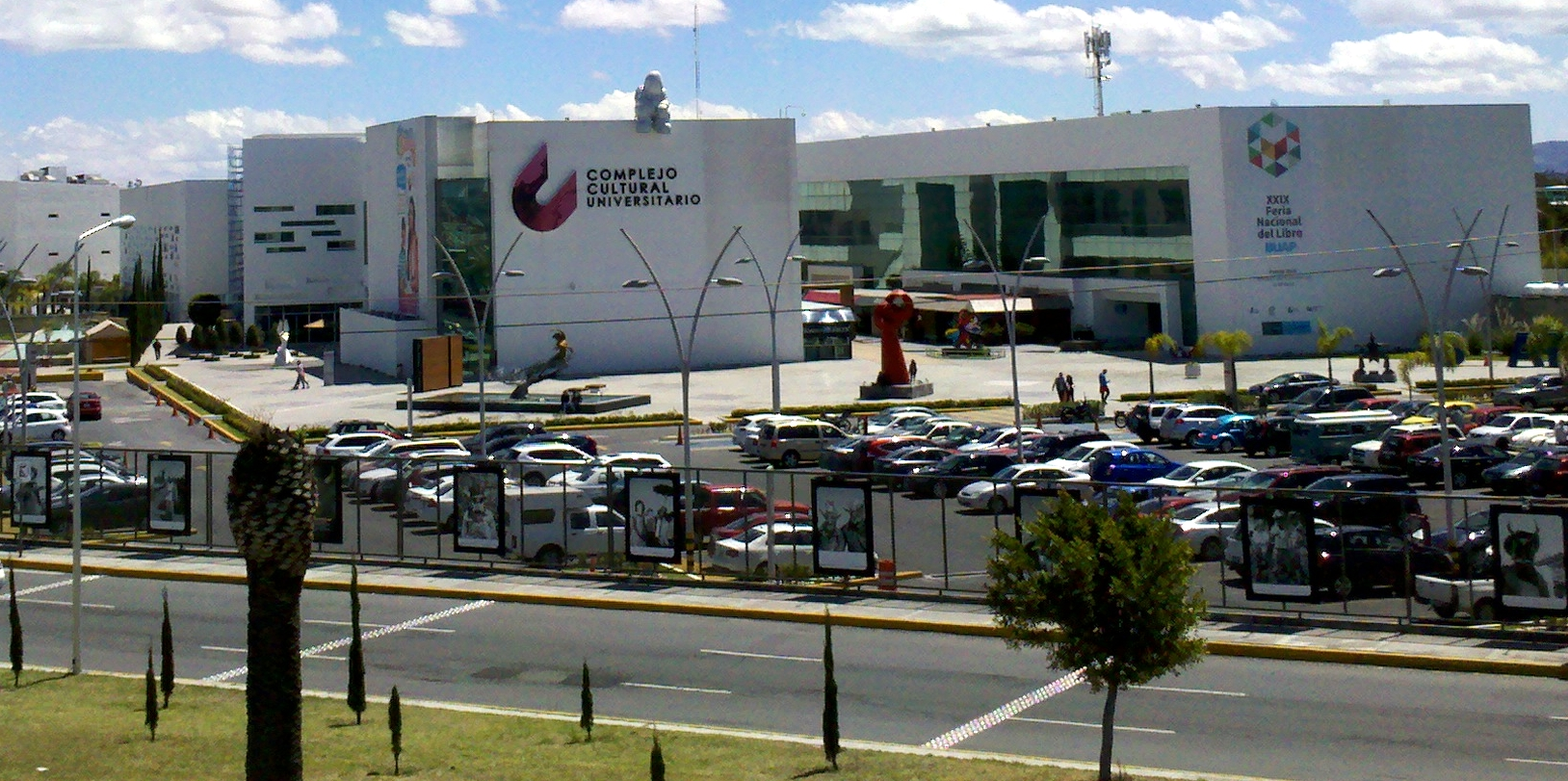

Angelópolis is a residential and commercial area in Puebla City, in the state of Puebla, Mexico.

Today it is one of the most modern areas in Mexico and the most important of Puebla. There are 3 universities there: Instituto Tecnológico y de Estudios Superiores de Monterrey, Universidad Iberoamericana, and Universidad Anáhuac; likewise there are some private schools like: Instituto Andes, Colegio del Bosque, etc. Splits and opulent residential developments contrast with some neighbors and villages in the area, like Concepción La Cruz, Santa Rosa and Ciudad Judicial. In the area is the known "Centro Comercial Angelópolis" (Angelópolis Mall); in addition, the area is noted for being one of the most luxurious in the country as a magnet for both local and foreign investors, for its skyscrapers, luxurious residential developments, cultural spaces, parks, malls, hospitals, service centers, tourist attractions, etc.

== History ==
The Megaproject "Angelópolis" was planned in 1995 by the state government to trigger the development of the region. In this plan were included the extension of 11 sur Avenue, construction of Atlixcáyotl Avenue, the rescue of the Historic Center and the deconstruction of the Convention Center, besides the use and fractionation of the land bank "Atlixcáyotl."

Since the installing of Angelópolis Mall (1994), until its final inauguration (2002), the name of the area took its name, so now the area is popularly called "Angelópolis" or "Zone (of) Angelópolis." Consequent to this, the price per square meter in the area began to increase; this trend is expected to increase further.

== Description ==
Angelópolis area has an approximate area of 15 km^{2}. It is notorious for the high purchasing power of most of its residents and the amount of skyscrapers, where the tallest building in Puebla is the Torre Adamant II, located on the side of the Atlixcáyotl Avenue. There are also several hospitals; private as the Puebla Hospital, the Ángeles Hospital and Torres Médicas, and public, as Cholula General Hospital and Hospital para el Niño Poblano.

The most attractive places are:

- Centro Comercial Angelópolis

The landmark of the area and which is called likewise, is a shopping mall located in the north of the area. Angelópolis is an exclusive resort, which boasts some of the best-known luxury brands. Its construction and inauguration was almost at the same time as Santa Fe in Mexico City.

- La Estrella de Puebla
- University Cultural Resort
- The Art Park
- Metropolitan Auditorium
- The Lineal Park
- Poblana Childhood Park
- Baroque Museum (In progress)
