= Parian =

Parian or Parián may refer to:

Pertaining to Paros, the Greek island:

- Parian marble, a stone quarried on Paros used for sculpture
- Parian ware, a ceramic substitute for marble which was fashionable in Victorian England
- Parian doll, a type of doll manufactured primarily in Germany, from around 1860 to 1880
- Parian Chronicle, a chronology carved into a stela of Parian marble

Based on Parián ("market"), a Spanish word of Cebuano and Tagalog origin that was subsequently imported from the Philippines into New Spain:

- Parián (Manila), a commercial neighborhood in Manila
- Parian, Calamba, a neighborhood in Calamba, Philippines
- El Parián (Puebla), a market in Puebla City, Puebla
- El Parián (Tlaquepaque), a market in Tlaquepaque, Jalisco
- Centro Comercial El Parián, a shopping center in Aguascalientes City, Aguascalientes

Iranian place names:

- Parian, Bushehr, a village in Bushehr Province, Iran
- Parian, Kermanshah, a village in Kermanshah Province, Iran

== See also ==
- Pariancillo Villa in Valenzuela, Metro Manila, whose name is derived from Parián
- Pariana and Parianella, plants
- Pariangan in Indonesia
