= Estrella de Puebla =

Tourist attraction in Puebla, Mexico

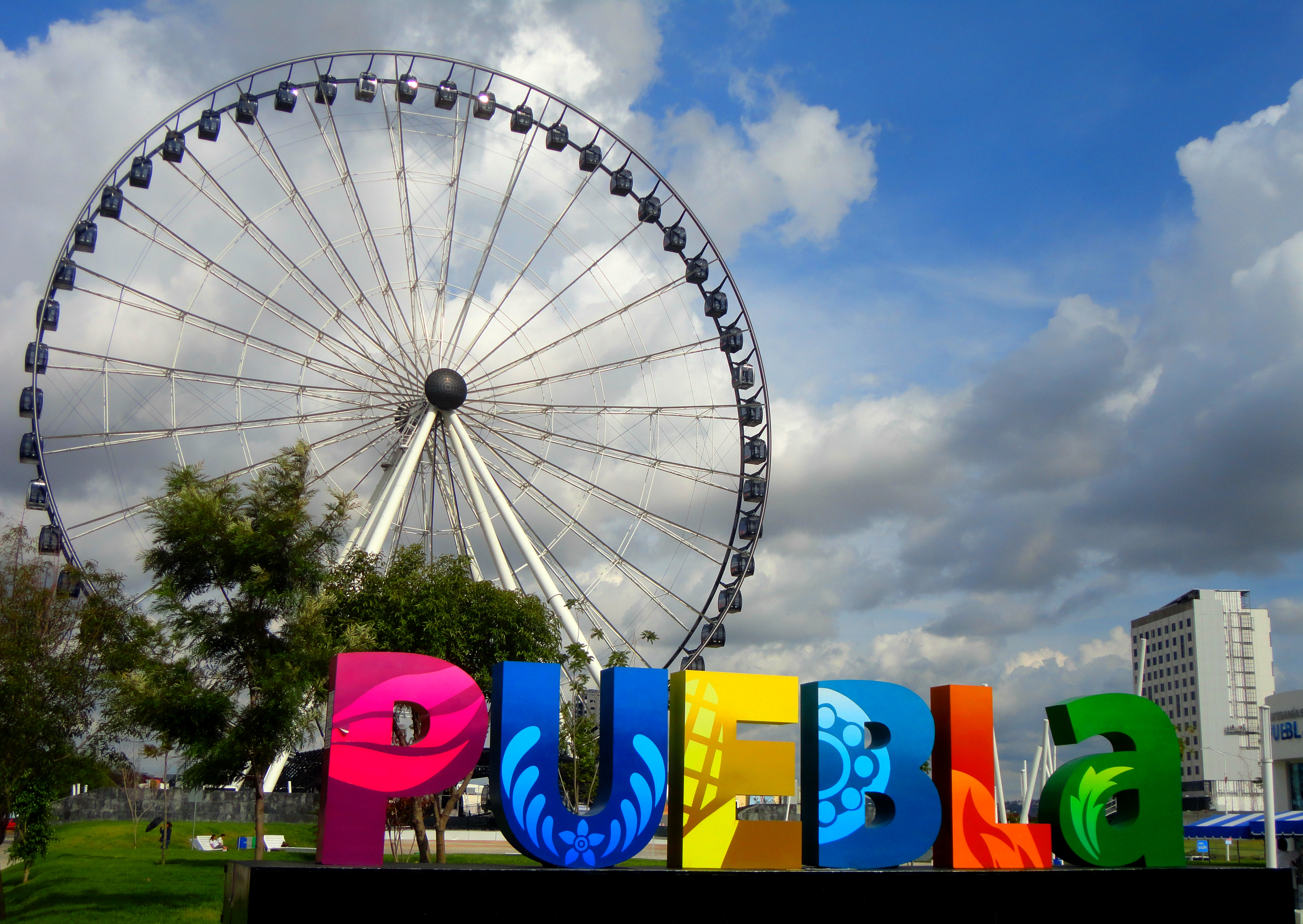
- Estrella de Puebla

Puebla
- Coordinates: 19.034435°N 98.232285°W
- Status: Operating
- Opening date: July 22, 2013

Ride statistics
- Attraction type: Ferris wheel
- Manufacturer: Maurer German Wheels GmbH
- Height: 80 m (260 ft)
- Duration: 20 minutes

Estrella de Puebla (Spanish for "Star of Puebla") is a touristic Ferris wheel located in Puebla de Zaragoza, in Puebla, Mexico. It was opened on July 22, 2013, by governor Rafael Moreno Valle Rosas. The wheel received the Guinness Record for the world's largest portable observation wheel, with a diameter of 69.8 meters (229 feet) and a height of 80 meters (260 feet). (Note: Should not be confused with the largest fixed observation wheel, which is the Singapore Flyer, in Singapore, with a height of 165 meters (541 feet).)

The Estrella de Puebla is part of a touristic complex that includes the Parque Lineal, Jardín del Arte, Ecoparque Metropolitano, Paseo del Río Atoyac, as well as the International Museum of the Baroque.

Governor Miguel Barbosa Huerta, stated that the idea of retiring the Estrella de Puebla has not been dismissed, as it is "Moreno Valle's insignia of waste". However, local media has demonstrated that the attraction is economically self-sustaining.

== Background ==
In January 2013, it was announced that governor Rafael Moreno Valle was evaluating the possibility of installing an observation wheel in Puebla, as part of the celebrations for the 151st-year anniversary of the Battle of Puebla. Later that month, it was confirmed that the government acquired a R80XL ferris wheel from the German company Maurer German Wheels GmbH at the price of 200 million Mexican pesos.

The original project consisted of the installation of the wheel at the Paseo Bravo historical zone, but it was opposed by INAH scholars and researchers. The project was moved to the Centro Escolar Niños Héroes de Chapultepec (CENHCH), where it too saw protests from the citizenship as well as parents and students from the CENHCH.

The project was then moved to its current location in the commercial zone Angelopólis. Its construction was firstly received with dissatisfaction, as the observation wheel caused constant blackouts to the population near the project due to the electrical power needed to install the wheel. In June 2013, the wheel was officially named Estrella de Puebla and was inaugurated on July 22, 2013.

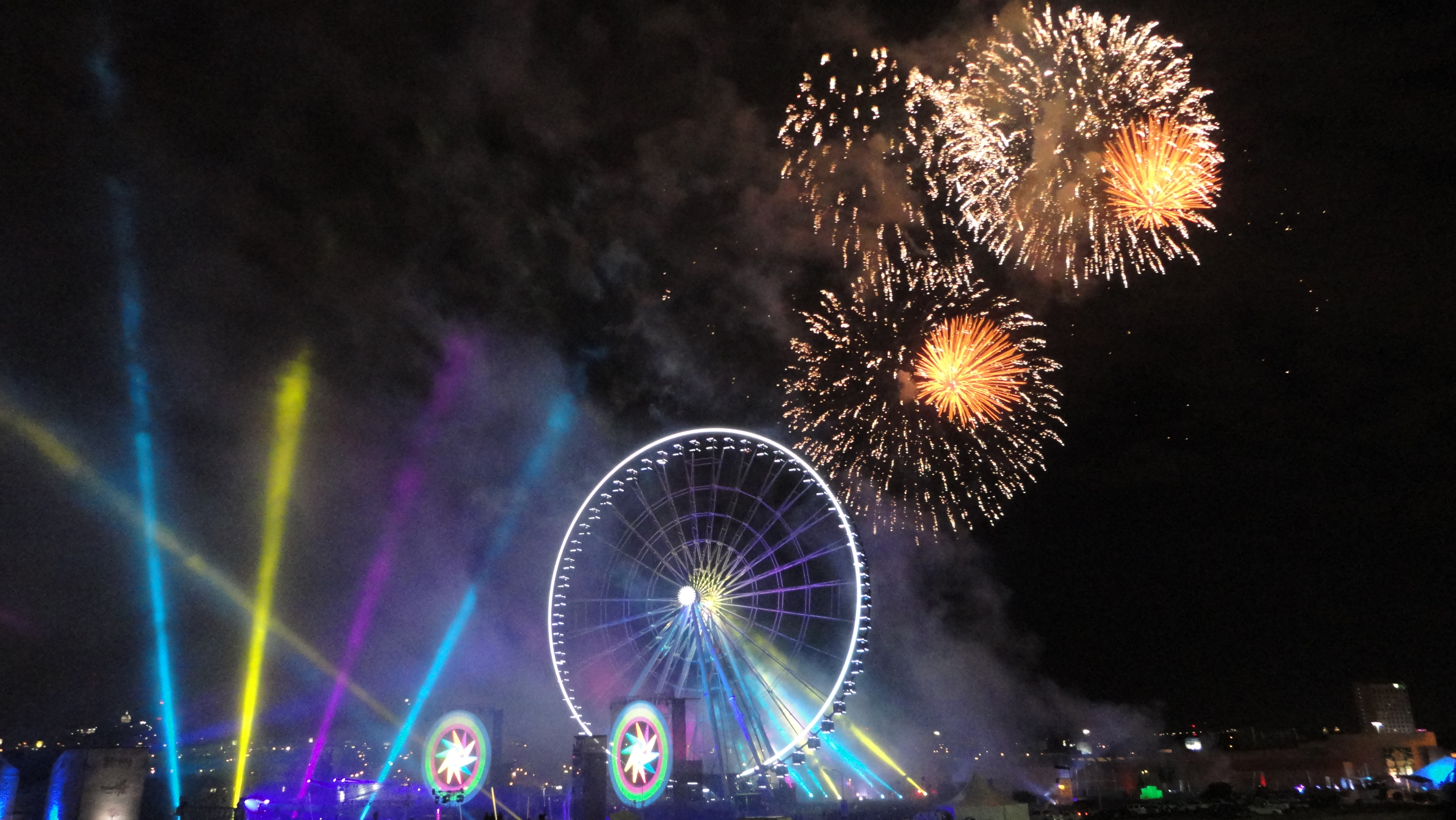
Opening of the Estrella de Puebla. July 22, 2013.

== Characteristics ==
The Estrella de Puebla is a R80XL-type Ferris wheel from the German company Maurer Wheels GmbH. Its height is an approximate of 80 meters (260 feet), containing 54 gondolas with a capacity of eight persons each. Four of those gondolas are considered luxury gondolas, which contain glass floors and leather seats. The observation wheel makes approximately three complete turns every hour.

The Ferris wheel is portable, meaning that it can be completely armed and disarmed without changing its structure, with the possibility of fitting in a regular container of 40x20 feet. The wheel also does not require foundations to be installed.

== Controversies ==
The Estrella de Puebla has been harshly criticized for its cost, which goes to 200 million Mexican pesos for the purchase of the wheel and 200 million pesos for the zone adjustments. It has also received remarks for its secrecy, as the government has not answered requests for public information, considering this information to be of a nature reserved for administration. For seven years, the local government has disclosed the cost and contract of the Ferris wheel.

The Estrella de Puebla suffered a failure a week after being opened, on July 29, 2013. The government attributed the failure to the braking system. The accident forced the authorities to evacuate passengers on the Ferris wheel and to temporarily close the tourist attraction.

In September 2015, it was announced that the Estrella de Puebla had spent 2.75 million pesos on electricity during its two years of operation.

=== Economic impact ===
There are no exact numbers on the economic expense of the Estrella de Puebla. According to Alejandro Castañedo, Secretary of Tourism of the City Hall of Puebla, in July 2015 the number of people (nationals and foreign) who had access to the Ferris wheel was unknown. As of that date, the Estrella de Puebla was the fifth most visited tourist attraction in the state of Puebla, after Puebla Cathedral, the Chapel of the Rosario, the Señor de las Maravillas in the Santa Monica Temple and Africam Safari Zoo.

In September 2015, the Secretary of Tourism of the State of Puebla, Ángel Trawitz, indicated that the Estrella de Puebla increased the visits to neighboring restaurants by 40% and called it a "tourist reference". Trawitz pointed out that the number of daily visitors to the Ferris wheel is unknown, which was estimated by journalistic research from a local newspaper to be 300 daily visitors. This number is about 85% less than the daily visitor average published by the state government during the first five months of the Ferris wheel's operation (2,300 per day).

== See also ==
- Angelópolis
