= Angelópolis Lifestyle Center =

Coordinates: 19°01′51.05″N 98°12′18.71″W

Centro Comercial Angelópolis
- Location: Heroica Puebla de Zaragoza, Puebla, Mexico
- Address: Boulevard del Niño Poblano, 2510. Esq. Autopista Puebla-Atlixco
- Opened: 1998, 2002
- Architect: Javier Sordo Madaleno
- Num. of stores: 156
- Num. of anchor tenants: 4
- Floor area: 78,630 m²
- Floors: 2
- Parking: 4227
- Website: www.angelopolispuebla.com.mx

Angelópolis Lifestyle Center, is an upscale shopping mall located in Puebla, Mexico. It covers more than 78,000 square meters. The mall was designed by the Sordo Madaleno group and developed as a public-private partnership.

It is anchored by Sears, Liverpool, and Palacio de Hierro department stores, Sanborns, a Cinepolis multi-cinema complex, and a casino. The mall is the second largest in the City before Parque Puebla . Shops occupy 156 commercial spaces that include sub-stores, recreation areas, fast food areas, restaurants, banks, service areas and two levels of parking. There is a fountain and food court on the ground floor.

== History ==
In the early 1980s, the city of Puebla was mainly residential. Throughout the decade, the population increased rapidly.

Javier Sordo Madaleno initiated the project and invited Liverpool and Palacio de Hierro groups as investors. Madaleno began negotiations with the government of the State of Puebla in 1994, for the acquisition of land in the area known as Land Reserve Atlixcáyotl. Angelópolis opened for public in 1998, with Liverpool and other stores. Later, stores such as C&A and Sears, Sanborns, boutiques and fast food joints opened. In 2002, the upstairs section of the mall was finished and El Palacio de Hierro was opened.

Angelópolis was planned by the state government to trigger the development of a new urban area. Since the opening of Angelópolis Lifestyle Center, the area is popularly known as Angelópolis, or Zone of Angelópolis.

== Infrastructure ==
- Fast Food Area
- More than 4,227 parking places
- Intelligent System of Illumination

== See also ==
- List of shopping malls in Mexico
- Puebla de Zaragoza
- San Andrés Cholula
