= R80XL =

Ferris wheel model

The Bussink Design R80XL is a type of giant Ferris wheel. It was designed by Bussink Design founder and CEO Ronald Bussink, and is manufactured under licence from Bussink Design GmbH of Switzerland by Maurer German Wheels and Chance American Wheels.

Described by Bussink Design as an observation wheel, it is offered in transportable (SP) and fixed (SV) versions, both with a height of approximately 78 metres (256 ft). The R80XL SP is currently the world's tallest-ever transportable giant observation wheel.

The first commercial R80XL installation was La Estrella de Puebla, or Star of Puebla, which opened in Mexico on 22 July 2013.

== Versions ==
The R80XL SP is fully transportable and intended for operation at multiple locations. Transportation requires approximately 60 specially adapted standard ISO containers.

The R80XL SV is intended for permanent (fixed) or long-term installations, and is described as the "stationary semi-transportable" version.

== Specifications ==
According to the Technical Details pages of the r80xl.com website, both the transportable and fixed versions of the R80XL have an overall height of "± 78 m", a diameter of "± 74 m", and a main axle height of "± 40 m".

Other sources have reported the height of the R80XL as being "250 ft (78 m)"[sic], "over 250 ft (78 m)"[sic], "approximately 80 m", and "80 m".

The 27-spoke wheel can rotate at speeds from 2 revolutions per hour up to 4 revolutions per hour.

The R80XL can be specified either with 27 passenger capsules, each able to carry up to 16 persons, or with 54 capsules, each able to carry up to 8 passengers. The smaller capsules are available in back-to-back, face-to-face, cocktail, or dinner layouts. A six-seat VIP capsule is also offered. All capsule variants are designed and manufactured by CWA Constructions of Switzerland.

== Manufacturers ==
Maurer German Wheels, a subsidiary of Maurer Söhne, holds an exclusive license to manufacture the R80XL in Europe. Maurer produced the first example of the R80XL at its factory in Munich, and erected it there late in 2012 prior to its delivery to a customer in Mexico. On Friday January 11, 2013, members of the press and media were invited by Maurer German Wheels and Bussink Design to experience the R80XL first hand. Various team members, including Ronald Bussink, were present.

Chance American Wheels, a subsidiary of Chance Rides of Wichita, Kansas, holds an exclusive license to manufacture and sell the R80XL SV in North America. The first wheel is expected to be ready for delivery by the beginning of 2014.

Breman Mega Wheels, a subsidiary of Breman Machinery is based in Genemuiden in the center of the Netherlands and is an Official Licensed Manufacturer of R80XL.
