= Juan Sordo Madaleno =

- Born: October 28, 1916; Mexico City
- Died: March 13, 1985 (aged 68); Mexico City
- Education: UNAM
- Occupation: Architect
- Spouse: Magdalena Bringas Aguado (1941–1985; his death)
- Children: Jose Juan Sordo Madaleno Bringas, Magdalena Sordo Madaleno Bringas, Javier Sordo Madaleno Bringas
- Awards: Honorary Fellow AIA
- Buildings: María Isabel Hotel, Palacio de Justicia, Palmas 555

Juan Sordo Madaleno (October 1916 in Mexico City – 12 March 1985 in Idem) was a Mexican architect.

== Biography ==
Sordo Madaleno was one of the most important Mexican architects of his era. He worked with other renowned architects, including Luis Barragán, Jose Villagran Garcia, Augusto H. Álvarez, Ricardo Legorreta, Francisco J. Serrano and José Adolfo Wiechers.

Architecturally, he settled initially in the Bauhaus style and influence of Le Corbusier. He designed especially hotels and residential buildings.

== Career ==
In 1937, he founded his architectural firm, now known as the Sordo Madaleno Arquitectos SC. This became a family-run company that has continued since. Over the years, the firm grew into one of Mexico's well-known architecture practices, designing many commercial, cultural, and housing projects. The company often worked together with other architects, and it continued to use parts of Juan Sordo Madaleno's modern style even as it expanded into larger city developments. His legacy is supported by an archive that collects and protects the history of his work and the history of the firm. This archive includes drawings, plans, photographs, and other materials from many years of projects. Because the firm is still active and the archive keeps his work available for study, Sordo Madaleno's influence continues to be felt in Mexican architecture today.

== Family ==
On 20 June 1941 he married Magdalena Bringas Aguado. Their children are: José Juan(1942–1974), Magdalena (born 1944) and Javier (born 1956).

Their son Javier Sordo Madaleno Bringas is also an architect and heads since 1982, the architectural firm. In 1963, he earned the Hacienda "La Laja" in Tequisquiapan in the Mexican state of Querétaro, where he successfully bred bulls and the family then lived.

== Important work ==
- 1951 — Cine Ermita - Mexico City
- 1954 — Cine París - Mexico City
- 1958 — Contigo Tower (formerly named Torre Anáhuac) - Mexico City
- 1959 — Hotel El Presidente - Acapulco
- 1958 — Cabaret La Jacaranda del Hotel El Presidente (in collaboration with Félix Candela) - Acapulco
- 1960 — Merck-Sharp & Dohme Factory - Mexico City
- 1961 — María Isabel Hotel - Mexico City (in collaboration with José Villagrán García)
- 1961 — San Ignacio de Loyola Church - Mexico City
- 1962 — Cartuchos Deportivos de México (in collaboration with Félix Candela) - Cuernavaca
- 1964 — Palacio de Justicia - Mexico City (in collaboration with José Adolfo Wiechers)
- 1969 — Plaza Universidad - Mexico City
- 1969 — El Presidente Hotel - Cozumel
- 1971 — Plaza Satélite - Ciudad Satélite, Naucalpan
- 1974 — El Presidente Hotel - Cancun,
- 1975 — Palmas 555 - Mexico City
- 1976 — Centro Corporativo Bancomer - Mexico City
- 1977 — Hotel Presidente InterContinental - Mexico City
- 1980 — Perisur - Mexico City

== See also ==
- Modernist architecture in Mexico
