= Plaza Universidad =

Shopping mall in Mexico City

Coordinates: 19.36713°N 99.16606°W

Plaza Universidad is a shopping mall located on Avenida Universidad in colonia Santa Cruz Atoyac, Benito Juárez borough, Mexico City. It was the first shopping center anchored by a department store built in the city, opened on November 28, 1969. It is still anchored by Sears Mexico, as well as Sanborn's, Yak Casino, and Cinépolis multicinemas.

Upon its opening, with 75 shops and 500 parking spaces, it was the largest shopping center in Mexico, retaining that title until 1971 when the larger Plaza Satélite opened. Both malls were designed by architect Juan Sordo Madaleno.
