= Plaza del Sol (Mexico) =

Coordinates: 20°39′5.84″N 103°24′0.89″W

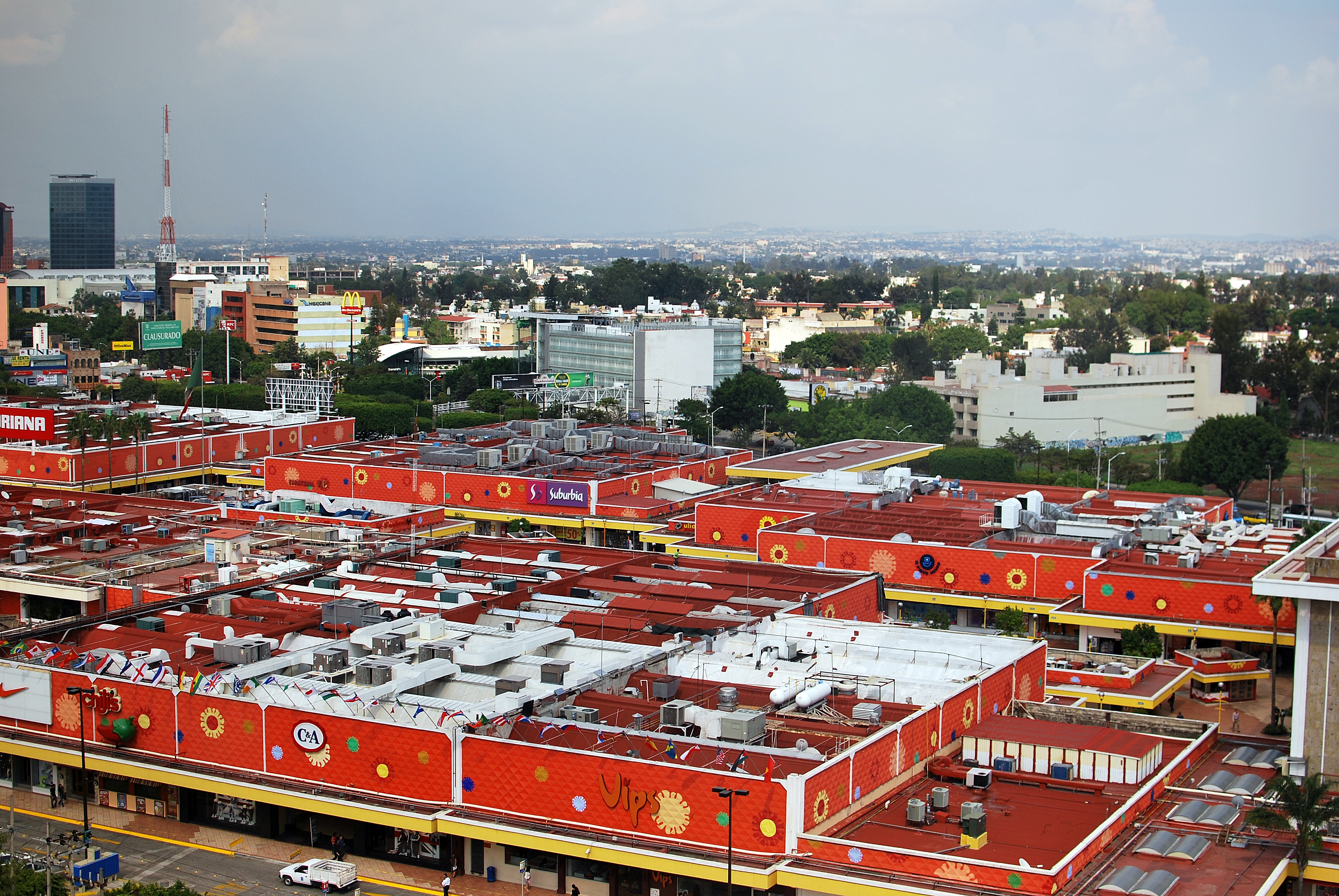
Plaza del Sol

Plaza del Sol is one of the largest shopping malls in the Guadalajara metropolitan area, Mexico, located in the municipality of Zapopan. Built at the end of the sixties by the architect Alejandro Zohn, it was the first mall in Latin America. It is the largest outdoor mall in the city, located next to the Plaza Milenium and future Torrena. Current anchors are Suburbia, Soriana supermarket and Mundara (a branch of El Nuevo Mundo department store with specific branding).

The mall was anchored by an 8,255-square-meter Fábricas de Francia department store, opened in 1969 and rebranded briefly in 2018–9 as Liverpool before Liverpool closed it in September 2021 as it opened a new store at nearby Distrito La Perla, and reopened the building a month later on October 7, 2021, as a branch of Suburbia, also owned by the El Puerto de Liverpool group.

It is located a few blocks away from the Expo Guadalajara and the Guadalajara World Trade Center on one of the highest commercial areas of the city and rivals in importance with La Gran Plaza, Plaza Pabellón, Centro Magno and Galerías Guadalajara. A more recent competitor is Distrito La Perla which opened in 2021 only 1 km to the west.
