= Parque Puebla =

Shopping mall in Puebla City, Mexico

Coordinates: 19.0699906°N 98.1756913°W

Parque Puebla is a shopping mall in the La Cienega area of Puebla City, Mexico, located between the Stadium District and the Instituto Tecnológico de Puebla near the Mexico City–Puebla tollway (150D). It was developed by Fibra Danhos at a cost of 4.5 billion pesos (240 million U.S. dollars). Governor Rafael Moreno of the State of Puebla inaugurated the center in January 2017.

Parque Puebla is anchored by Sears and Liverpool department stores and a Cinepolis multi-cinema complex.

A Fiesta Inn hotel will be built at the complex, and he 500-million-peso (28-million-dollar) "Michin" aquarium is set to be added to the complex in 2019.
