= Torrena =

Skyscraper in Mexico

Coordinates: 20°38′50″N 103°24′19″W

Torrena or Torre Nacional (National Tower) was a planned 336.5 metres (1,104 ft)-high telecommunications and entertainment vaporware tower in the city of Guadalajara, Jalisco, Mexico. The tower started construction in the spring of 2005. However the project was stopped on 2006, shortly after land excavation, remaining on hold for a couple of years until it was definitely cancelled on 2010.

Torrena, from the beginning of its planning and even during its construction, was surrounded by rumors and confusion. When developers released information about the project most of the time it was unclear and sometimes false. Main advertising and project propaganda were announced in mid 2004, stating that the project was going to be completed and finished sometime in late 2007.

If built, Torrena would be titled as the 10th tallest building/structure of the world (2006). It also would be a cutting-edge technology tower, with LED screens, wide city views and landscape, and an exclusive restaurant at the top of it. The tower was going to be a strong cultural and touristic pole for the entire city of Guadalajara.

Torrena was being constructed in the municipality of Zapopan in an area of 17,720 m^{2}, right next to the Plaza del Sol shopping mall. It would also include banks, coffee and souvenir shops and two restaurants (one of them with a revolving floor) among other spaces destined to entertainment and telecommunications. After it was cancelled, no further details or causes were provided by the project developers, increasing curiosity and titling Torrena as one of the most polemic projects in the whole country.

== See also ==
- List of towers
- List of tallest freestanding structures in the world
