= Galerías Guadalajara =

Shopping mall in Zapopan, Jalisco, Mexico

Coordinates: 20.676764°N 103.431778°W

- Location: Zapopan, Jalisco, Mexico

Galerías Guadalajara is a fashion mall in Zapopan, located in the metropolitan area of Guadalajara in the Mexican State of Jalisco, opened to the public in November 2003. The project was designed by Grupo Link, and was built on the abandoned construction site of a shopping center that could never be completed and that was going to be called Plaza Hemisferia. This fashion mall has an area of 160,000 m^{2} which contains 220 commercial premises divided into three floors, whose anchor stores are Liverpool, Sears, Sanborns and Cinépolis, and subanchors such as H&M, C&A, Zara, Pull&Bear and Bershka in addition to including Walmart, Sam's Club, Suburbia and Vips as additional stores, since these have mutual connection with the Galerías Guadalajara shopping center through two parking lots.

== See also ==
- List of shopping malls in Mexico
