= Samara (Mexico City) =

Mixed-use development in Santa Fe, Mexico City

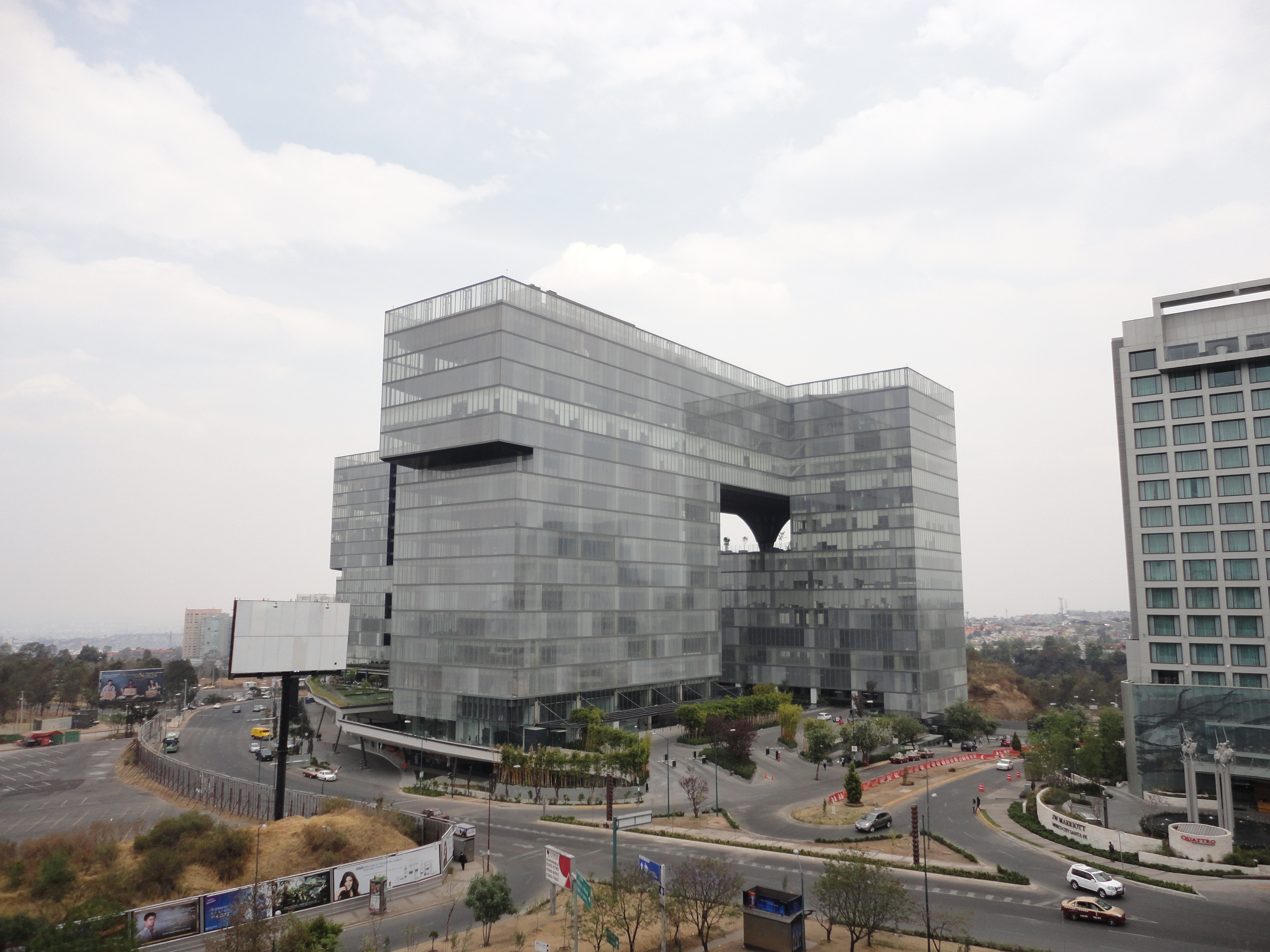
Samara

Samara is a mixed-use development in Santa Fe, Mexico City, that largest concentrated area of commercial and office space at the city's westernmost end. Fibra Uno bought the complex for 5.4 billion Mexican pesos in 2014, around 405 million USD. The complex is 144,000 square metres (1,550,000 sq ft) in total, of which 30,000 square metres (320,000 sq ft) is a shopping center (Samara Shops) with around 100 shops including Chedraui Selecto supermarket, Sport City gym, and Cinépolis multicinema. There are around 600,000 monthly visitors as of 2022.

The corporate offices area (Samara Corporativo) include the headquarters of Fibra Uno itself, of Volaris airlines and the Mexico City headquarters of Grupo Lala, a leader in retail dairy products. There is a Hilton hotel in the complex. 10,000 sqm is dedicated to a garden.
