= Metrópoli Patriotismo =

Metrópoli Patriotismo is a shopping center at Av. Patriotismo 229, in the Napoles neighborhood in Mexico City. It is anchored by a Cinemex multi-cinema, Sanborns, and a ONE hotel. The design was by Grupo Arquitech.

The center opened in 2006 and represented an investment of 615 million pesos. In 2011 Grupo Empresarial Kaluz began an expansion which cost 750 million pesos and which brought the total area from 65,000 square metres (700,000 sq ft) to 120,000 square metres (1,300,000 sq ft). The new section of the complex was built northbound of the original, in the limits with the neighboring Colonia Escandón.
