= Portal San Ángel =

Portal San Ángel is a shopping mall located on Avenida Revolución in Colonia Los Alpes in the San Ángel area of southern Mexico City.

It opened in 2017 and has 59,094 m^{2} of leasable area, 84 stores and 1935 parking spaces. Tenants include Sears, Sam's Club, Wal-Mart, H&M, Cinépolis, Chili's, Red Lobster, and P.F. Chang's.
