= Distrito La Perla =

Distrito La Perla is a mixed-use development featuring a 35,000 m^{2} (380,000 sq ft) shopping center that opened in 2021 in affluent Zapopan, in the Guadalajara metropolitan area (2020 pop. 5.3 million), Jalisco state, Mexico. Distrito La Perla includes a 4-building office complex, "central park" and adjacent Wyndham Garden hotel. The architects were Skidmore, Owings & Merrill.

It is anchored by a Liverpool department store and a Cinépolis multicinema, and there are two-story Zara, Pull & Bear, Bershka, Coppel, Forever 21 and H&M stores, a food court, full-service restaurants. Amenities include a basketball court, dog park, and "culture pavilion". There is a three-level parking structure with space for 4,500 vehicles.

It has space for up to 236 stores on 3 levels. Some businesses opened in September 2021, but the ribbon-cutting was March 2022. Liverpool store moved from a previous location in Plaza del Sol, which had opened in 1969. The center is partially covered, partially open-air, with air flowing freely from outside to the covered areas. 8 billion Mexican pesos (about US$450 million) were invested in to design, build and open the complex.

The upscale mall Andares, also anchored by a Liverpool as well as El Palacio de Hierro, is also located in Zapopan about 9 km (6 mi) to the north of La Perla. Plaza del Sol is only 1 km to the east.

== Office complex ==
Distrito La Perla is a four-building office complex that has a total gross leasable area (GLA) of 39,575 square meters and opened in October 2019.
