= Parian, Kermanshah =

Parian پريان
- Village
- Location within Iran
- Coordinates: 34°39′41″N 47°13′16″E
- Country: Iran
- Province: Kermanshah
- County: Sahneh
- Bakhsh: Dinavar
- Rural District: Kanduleh

Population (2006)
  - Total: 217
- Time zone: UTC+3:30 (IRST)
  - Summer (DST): UTC+4:30 (IRDT)

Parian (Persian: پريان, also Romanized as Parīān) is a village in Kanduleh Rural District, Dinavar District, Sahneh County, Kermanshah Province, Iran. At the 2006 census, its population was 217, in 51 families.
