= Plaza Insurgentes =

Shopping center in Mexico City, Mexico

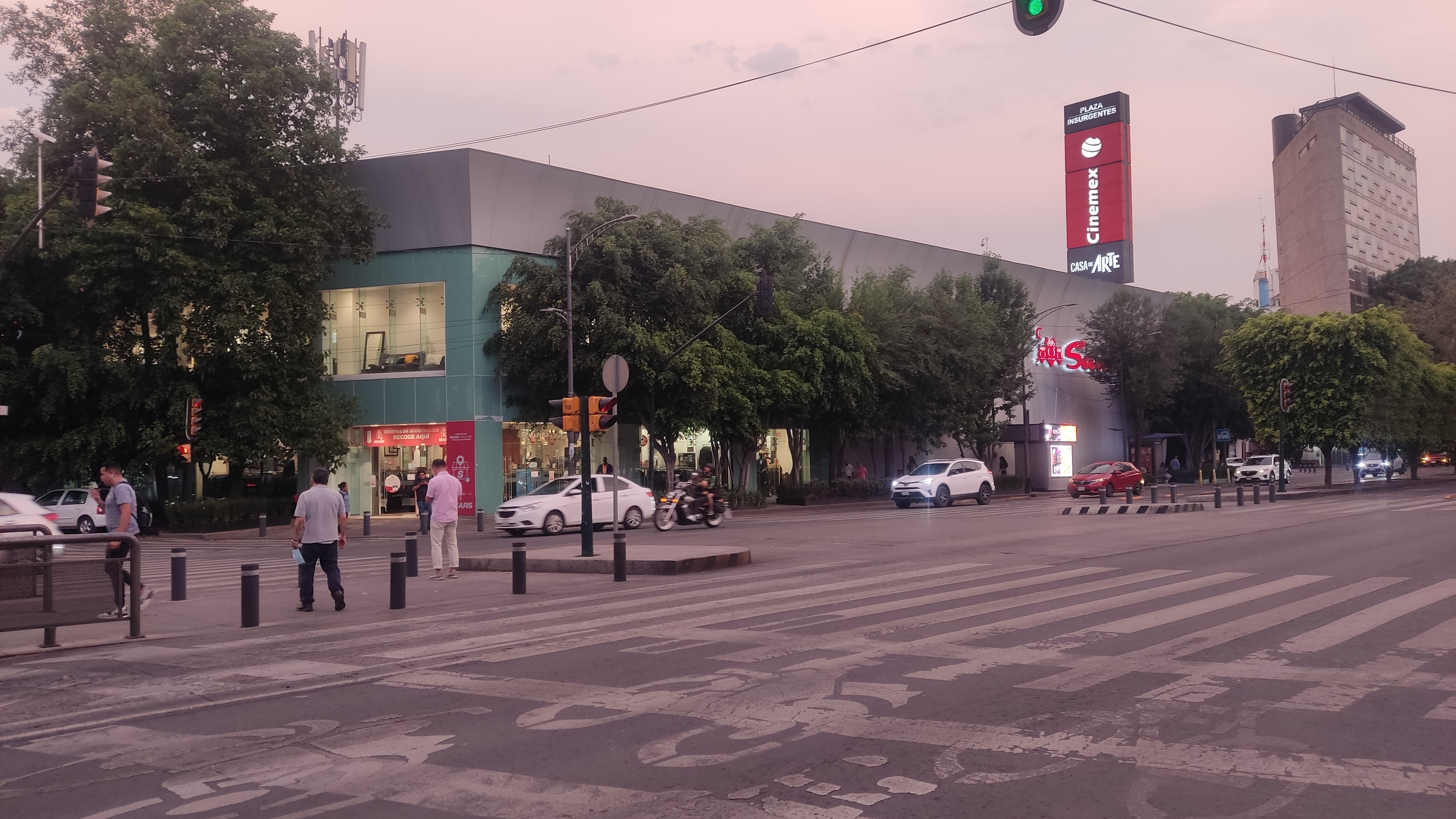
- The shopping center in 2023
- Location: Colonia Roma, Cuauhtémoc, Mexico City
- Coordinates: 19.4123938°N 99.1657990°W
- Address: San Luis Potosí 214, at Avenida de los Insurgentes
- Opened: 1999 (as a shopping center); 27 February 1947 (as a Sears store)
- Owner: Inmuebles Carso (Grupo Carso)
- Num. of stores: 25 (2026)
- Num. of anchor tenants: 1 (Sears)
- Floor area: 8,327 square metres (89,630 sq ft) (gross leasable)
- Floors: 2
- Parking: 841 spaces
- Public transit: Sonora (Metrobús)
- Website: plazainsurgentes.com.mx

Plaza Insurgentes is a shopping center on Avenida de los Insurgentes at the corner of San Luis Potosí street in Colonia Roma, Mexico City. It occupies the building of the first Sears store in Mexico, which Sears, Roebuck and Co. opened in February 1947 on the former site of the American School. The store's opening drew crowds of over 100,000 people in its first days, and the historian Julio Moreno has studied it as an example of how a United States retailer adapted to Mexican conditions after the Second World War. In 1999 the store was remodeled and enlarged into a shopping center, with a smaller Sears as its anchor, a Sanborns and a Cinemex multiplex. It is owned by Inmuebles Carso, the real estate company of Carlos Slim's Grupo Carso.

== History ==
=== Site ===
Before Sears, the corner of Insurgentes and San Luis Potosí was occupied by the American School. In 1945 Sears, Roebuck paid US$516,000 for the property, which was in a quiet part of the city, close to a fashionable residential area and far from the main shopping district in the city center.

=== First Sears store in Mexico ===
The store opened on 27 February 1947. (Note: El Universal and Sears Mexico's own website give 27 February 1947. Moreno gives 28 February.) Its opening included a religious ceremony, and Sears promoted the store with the slogan "Satisfacción completa o la devolución de su dinero" ("Complete satisfaction or your money back"). The crowds were so large that the company issued passes to control entry; according to the International Directory of Company Histories, 123,000 people came on opening day and bought US$600,000 worth of goods, all paid in cash. Moreno, using reports in the Sears archives, puts attendance at about 110,000 over the first three days. He describes customers who stayed outside after closing time to look through the windows, others who cut the ropes at the entrance and tried to get in through the back doors, and employees and shoppers who fainted from the heat and crowding. The store sold nearly all its stock within a week, and three aircraft were sent to bring more merchandise from the company's warehouse in Texas.

The Mexico City store did about US$16 million in business in its first year, roughly two and a half times what the parent company had expected. Sears introduced window displays to Mexico and pioneered installment buying, cash registers and large-scale newspaper display advertising there; Grupo Sanborns, its later owner, also credits it with introducing merchandise on open shelves, credit cards and operating manuals. Customers liked its fixed, clearly displayed prices, which did away with bargaining. Whereas customers of established department stores such as El Palacio de Hierro had their clothes made to measure, Sears sold low-cost ready-made clothing and presented itself as a store for the middle class.

A few months after the opening, the Mexican government banned some nonessential imports and raised tariffs on others to protect its foreign currency reserves. The store, which had imported up to 90 percent of its merchandise, turned to Mexican manufacturers, and by 1949 about 2,500 Mexican suppliers provided some 80 percent of the goods it sold. Moreno presents Sears's early years in Mexico as a case of an American company that succeeded by embracing Mexican culture and nationalism, in contrast to firms that disregarded local traditions and were slow to make a profit. Sears opened its second and third Mexican stores, in Monterrey and Guadalajara, in 1949.

Photographs from the 1960s show the building still as a single department store with large display windows facing the street.

=== Shopping center ===
In 1997 Grupo Carso bought 85 percent of Sears Mexico. The Insurgentes store was remodeled and enlarged, and it reopened in 1999 as Plaza Insurgentes, a shopping center with Sears as its anchor store. (Note: Inmuebles Carso gives 1999 as the year the center began operating. Geographer José Gasca-Zamora lists it as opening in 1996.) Part of the original department store was divided to make room for smaller shops and restaurants. In a 2017 study of the city's shopping centers, Gasca-Zamora places Plaza Insurgentes, with Pabellón Polanco and Galerías Insurgentes, among the centers opened from the mid-1980s to the late 1990s in business districts and commercial corridors, and counts it among seven centers on the central and southern stretch of Avenida de los Insurgentes, a corridor that also includes Perisur.

== Description ==
Plaza Insurgentes stands on a plot of 14,318 square metres (154,120 sq ft) and has 61,874 square metres (666,010 sq ft) of built space, including 8,327 square metres (89,630 sq ft) of gross leasable area on two levels, and 841 parking spaces. Inmuebles Carso gives Colonia Roma and the Insurgentes corridor as its catchment area. The company has also reported about 150,000 visitors a month. In 2026 the center had 25 stores, with Sears as anchor, Sanborns as sub-anchor and a Cinemex cinema. A stock analyst at Bursamétrica described Sears in 2023 as a store for customers of upper-middle economic status. According to Time Out México, the Cinemex has seven screens, four of them premium, and one screen is used for festival programs such as those of the Morelia International Film Festival. There is also a food court.

The center's directory lists restaurants and fast food outlets including McDonald's, Sushi Roll, the Chinese restaurant La Fe, Flautomanía and the restaurant-bar Aluchic, alongside Nutrisa, a chain selling frozen yogurt and health foods. Retail tenants include the footwear chain Flexi, the Colombian jeans brand Khoor, the jeweler Bizzarro, Sally Beauty Supply, the supplement store GNC, the electronics retailer Steren, an AT&T mobile phone store, the variety store Mumuso, a beauty salon and a Sears Auto Center. The center also has a Selecto Supercito, a small-format supermarket of Chedraui. Chedraui aims the Selecto Supercito format at a higher-income niche, with gourmet products alongside everyday groceries.

Mexico City's tourism office describes the center as a landmark and something of a neighborhood center for the surrounding area, including residents of Hipódromo Condesa across Insurgentes. A freestanding Woolworth and a multistory MINISO store also face Avenida Insurgentes nearby. The nearest Metrobús stop is Sonora, on Line 1.

== Gallery ==
Plaza Insurgentes in 2024

Plaza Insurgentes in 2024

East entrance

Interior

Interior
