= Paseo Acoxpa =

- Location within Mexico City urban area

General information
- Location: Calzada Acoxpa 430, colonia ex-Hacienda Coapa, 14300 Ciudad de México, CDMX, Tlalpan borough, Mexico City, Mexico
- Coordinates: 19.299541°N 99.137217°W
- Opened: 2010

Website
- paseoacoxpa.com

Paseo Acoxpa is an outdoor shopping center of 56,000 square metres (602,779 sq ft) opened in 2010 in colonia Ex-Hacienda Coapa, in Tlalpan borough, Mexico City. It is located on the Calzada de Acoxpa east of the Calzada de Tlalpan. It was developed by Grupo Arquitech, with an investment of 100 million U.S. dollars. Tenants include: Best Buy, El Grupo Palacio de Hierro present in the formats "Boutique Palacio" and "Casa Palacio", Sport City, Cinépolis, Nike, Deportes Martí, and California Pizza Kitchen.
