= Patio Santa Fe =

Shopping center in Mexico City

Coordinates: 19°22′38″N 99°15′16″W

Patio Santa Fe, original name Gran Patio Santa Fe, is a 2,100,000-square-foot (200,000 m^{2}) vertical power center in Santa Fe, Mexico City. It is nine stories tall anchored by Walmart, Sam's Club, The Home Depot, Office Depot, Petco, a Sportium gym, Cinépolis 16-screen multicinema, and a 7,000-square-metre (75,000 sq ft) glass-covered rooftop park. It has approximately 130 retail shops, 25 restaurants including Red Lobster, Toks, and IHOP, and 2,800 parking spaces.
