= Luna Parc =

Semi-private museum, atelier, and private home

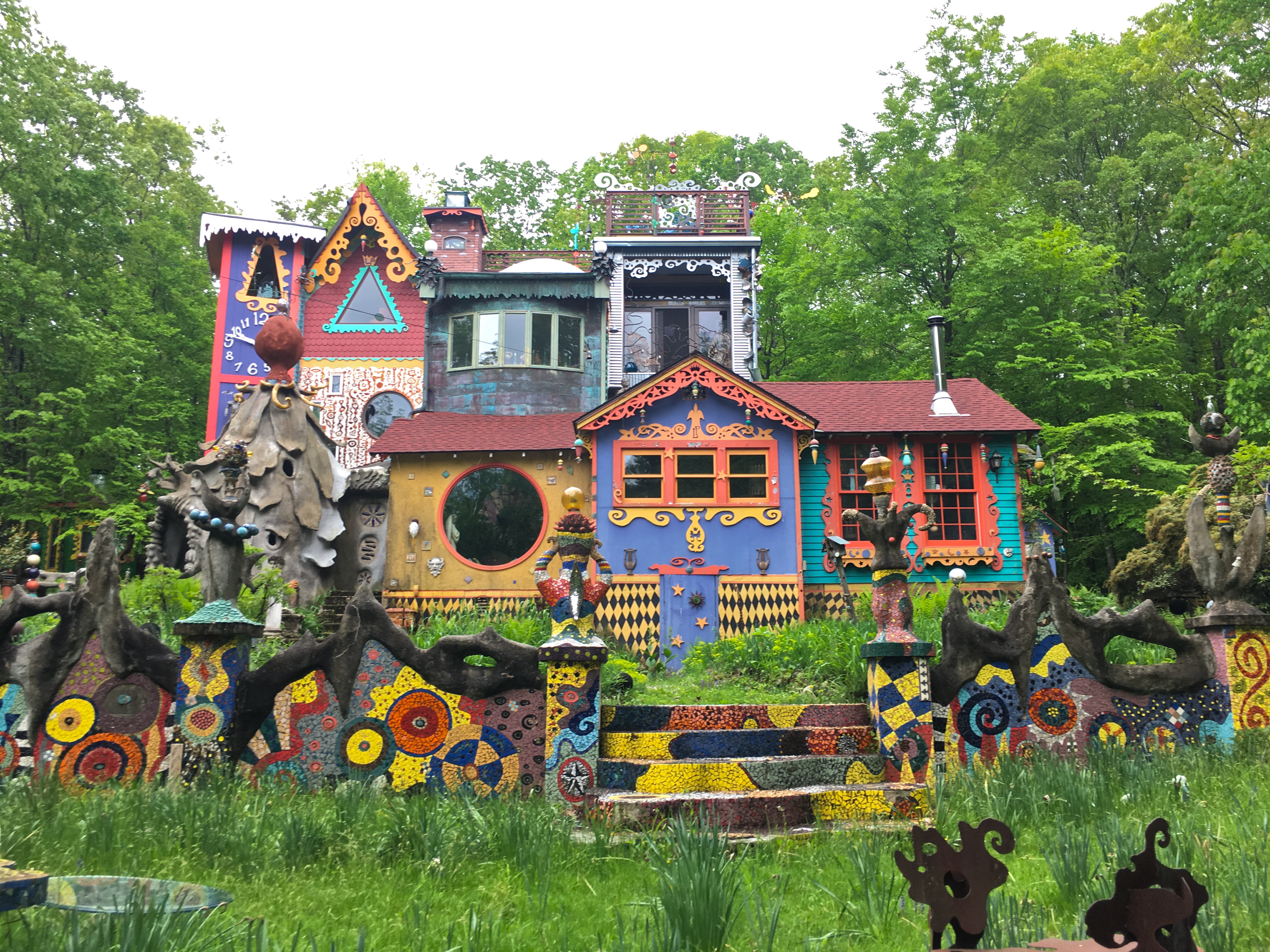
- Front view of the main house of Luna Parc
- Interactive map of Luna Parc
- Location: Sandyston Township, New Jersey, U.S.
- Coordinates: 41°15′8.316″N 74°47′16.62″W
- Established: 1989
- Founder: Richard Boscarino
- Designer: Richard Boscarino
- Etymology: Rome park by same name
- Operator: Richard Boscarino
- Visitors: 5,226
- Open: During semi-annual Open House
- Status: Active

Location of Luna Parc

Luna Parc is the semi-private museum, atelier, and private home of 21st century American multimedia artist Richard "Ricky" Boscarino located in Sandyston Township, New Jersey, United States. Twice a year, the museum and atelier are opened to the public for a three-weekday Open House.

== Description ==
Luna Parc comprises multiple buildings and outdoor art pieces set in an 8.5-acre densely-wooded landscape. These structures are built from metal, clay, glass, wood, rock, ceramic, cement, and ferro-cement. They are designed in a whimsical architectural style, featuring vivid colors, curving surfaces, detailed mosaic tiling, and incorporating unusual objects such as bowling balls and license plates.

The fantastical outdoor appearance of Luna Parc resembles Gaudí's Park Güell in Barcelona, Spain, and the Hundertwasser House in Vienna, Austria, because Boscarino drew inspiration from both these European sites.

The main building is a 5,000 square foot residential house. The interior of this house is a cabinet of curiosities exhibiting thousands of artifacts ranging from the exotic (e.g., Tibetan yak leather pouch) to the absurd (human fallopian tubes floating in a glass vessel). Also on display inside are Boscarino's individual works of art such as his oil paintings and articulated metallic insect jewelry.

== Related organization ==
Boscarino is also an officer in The Luna Parc Atelier Foundation Inc. The Foundation is a not-for-profit entity registered under US IRC as a 501(c)(3) organization that serves as an art colony and is chartered to teach and provide hands-on training to aspiring artists and apprentice workers. One mission of the Foundation is to ensure the continued existence of Luna Parc as a creative museum. Much of the Foundation's training, events, and fundraising takes place on the grounds of Luna Parc.

== Critical reception ==
Mark Sceurman, co-creator and publisher of History Channel's reality television series Weird U.S., described Luna Parc in 2014 as "Of all the places we've seen, I think this is the strangest".

== Some works exhibited ==
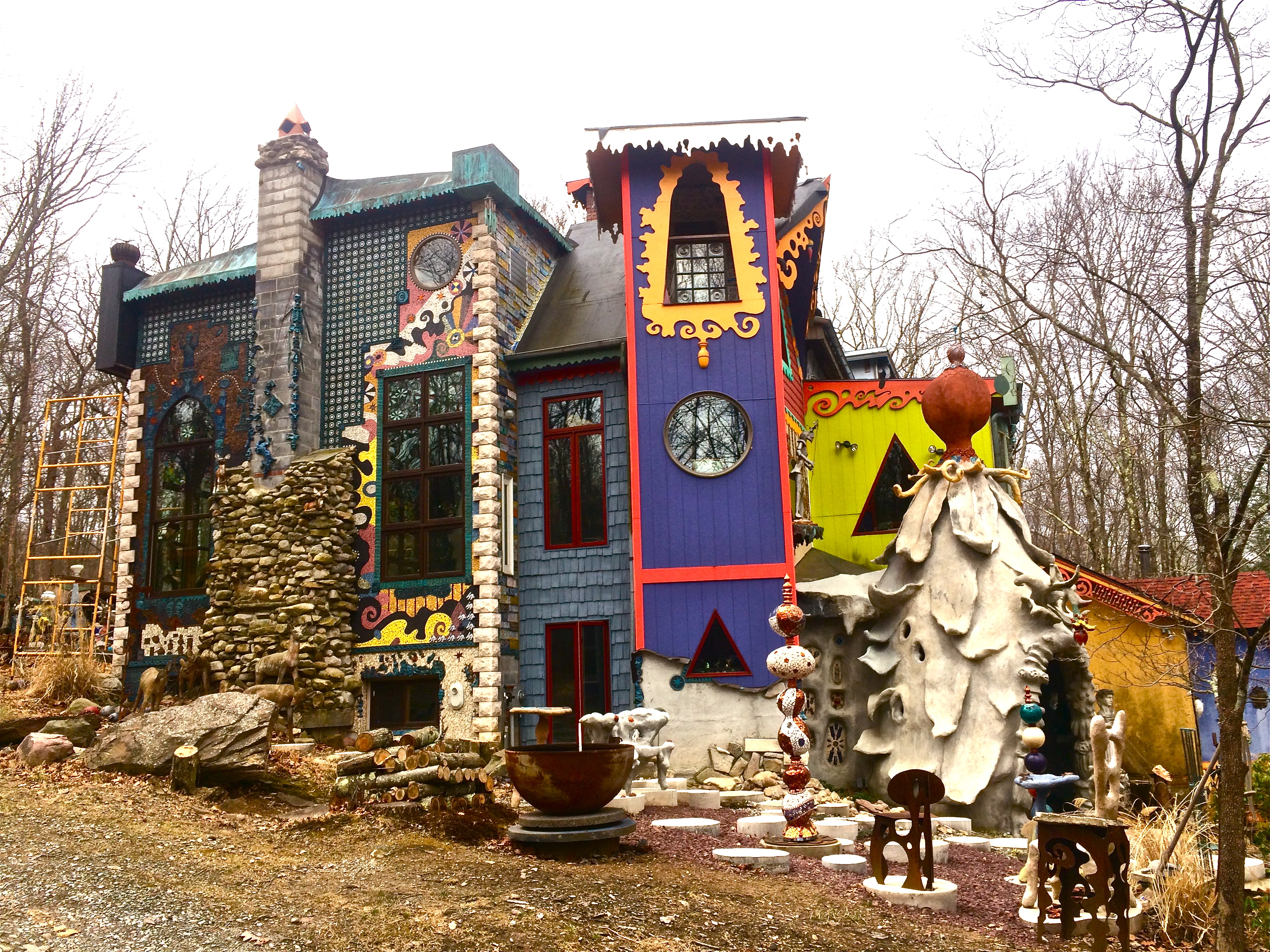
Facade of Luna Parc built of wood, rock, concrete, and ceramic mosaics

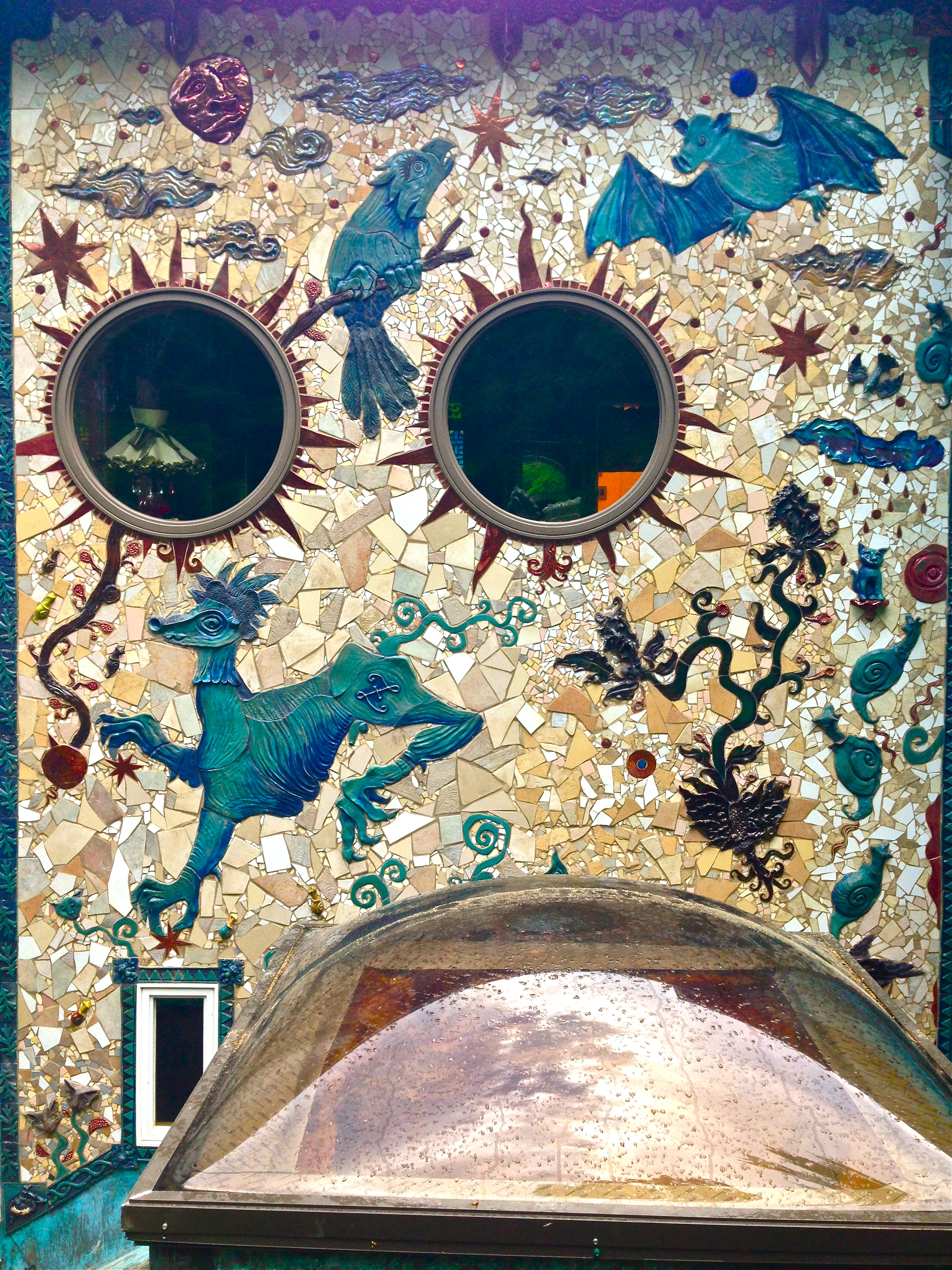
Closeup of Boscarino detailed mosaic art

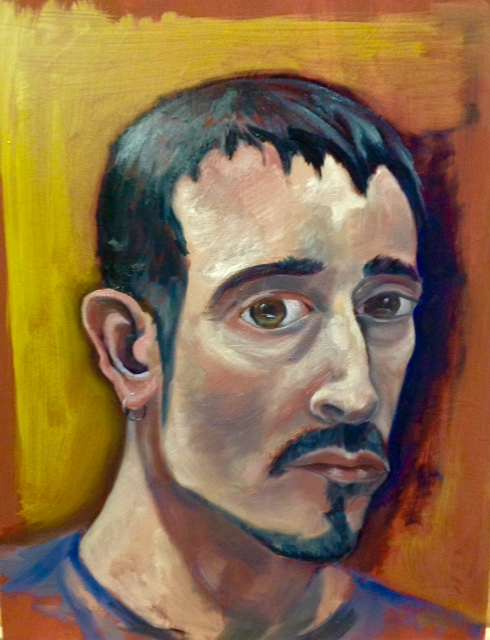
Example of Boscarino oil paintings on display at Luna Parc (self-portrait)

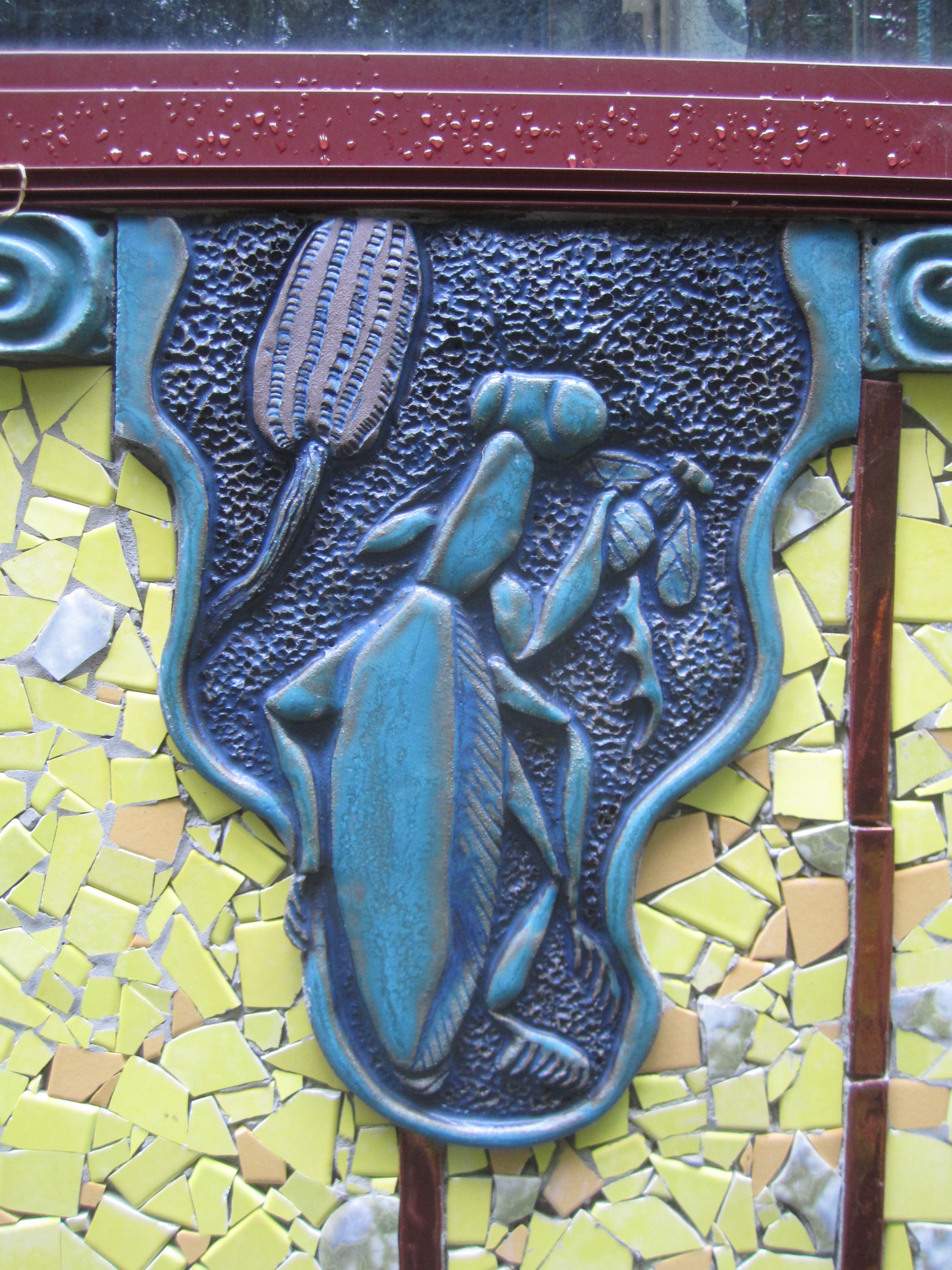
Example of Boscarino ceramic plaque embedded into facade

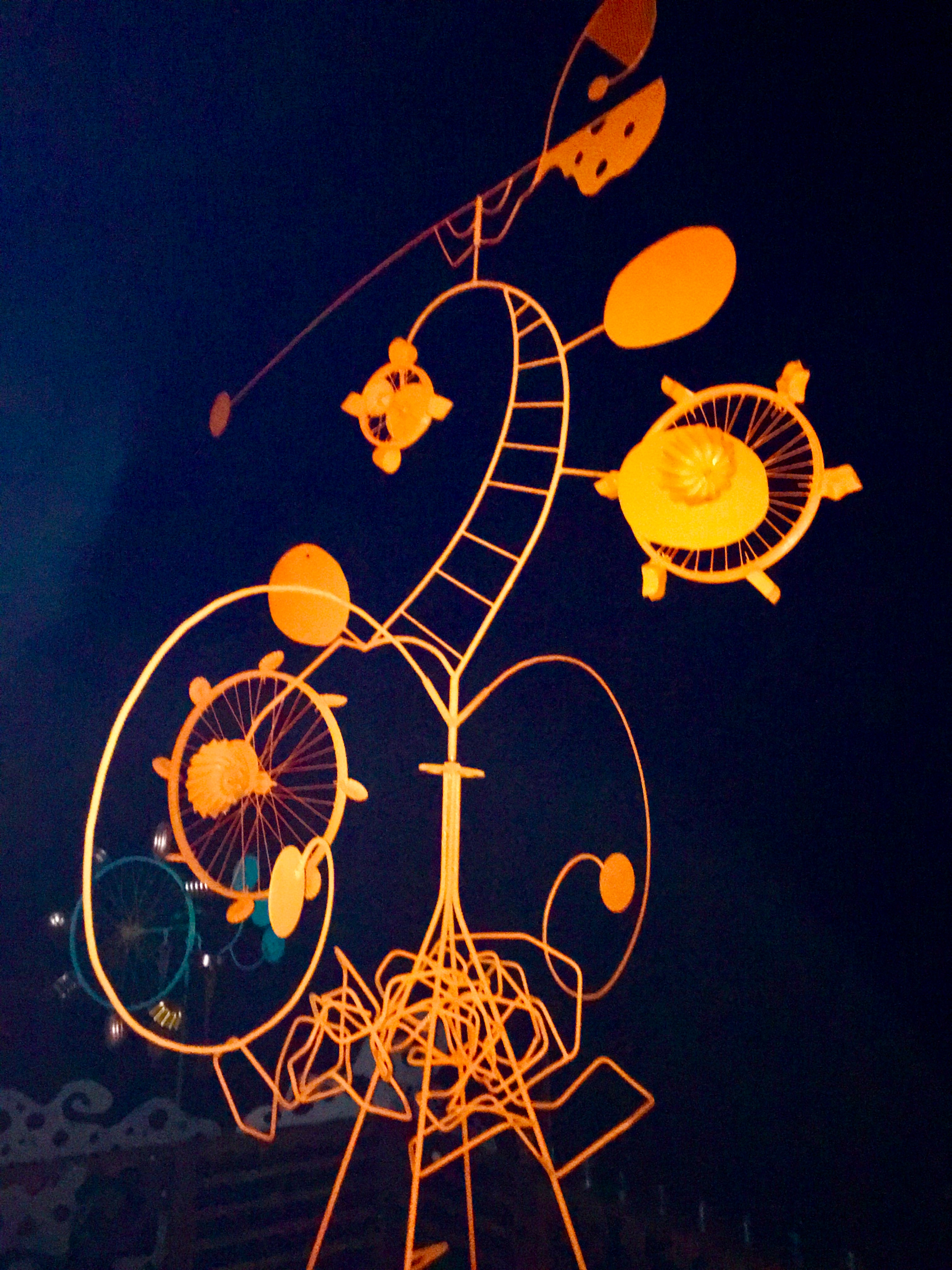
Outdoor wind machine Boscarino built from rebar and bicycle wheels

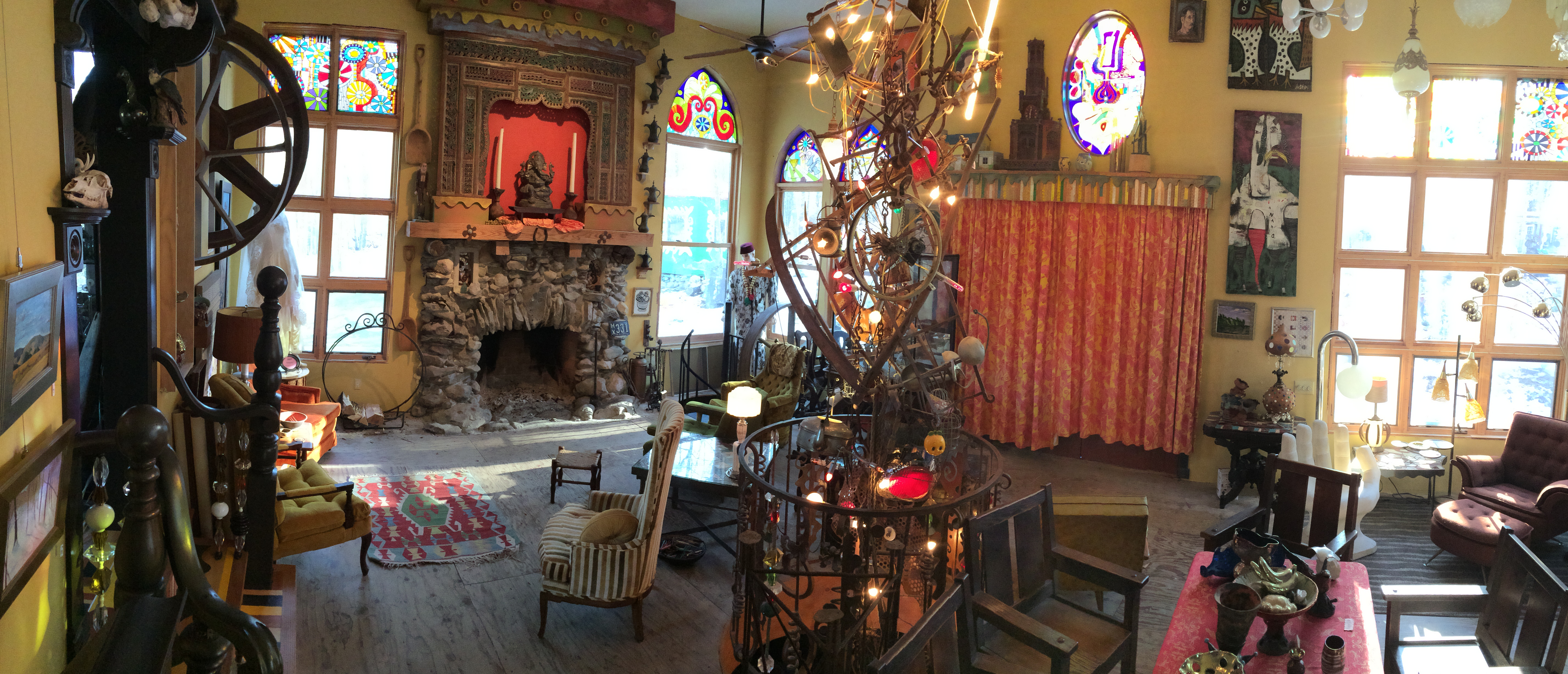
Multimedia ballroom showing Boscarino sculptures, Boscarino stained glass, and artifact collections

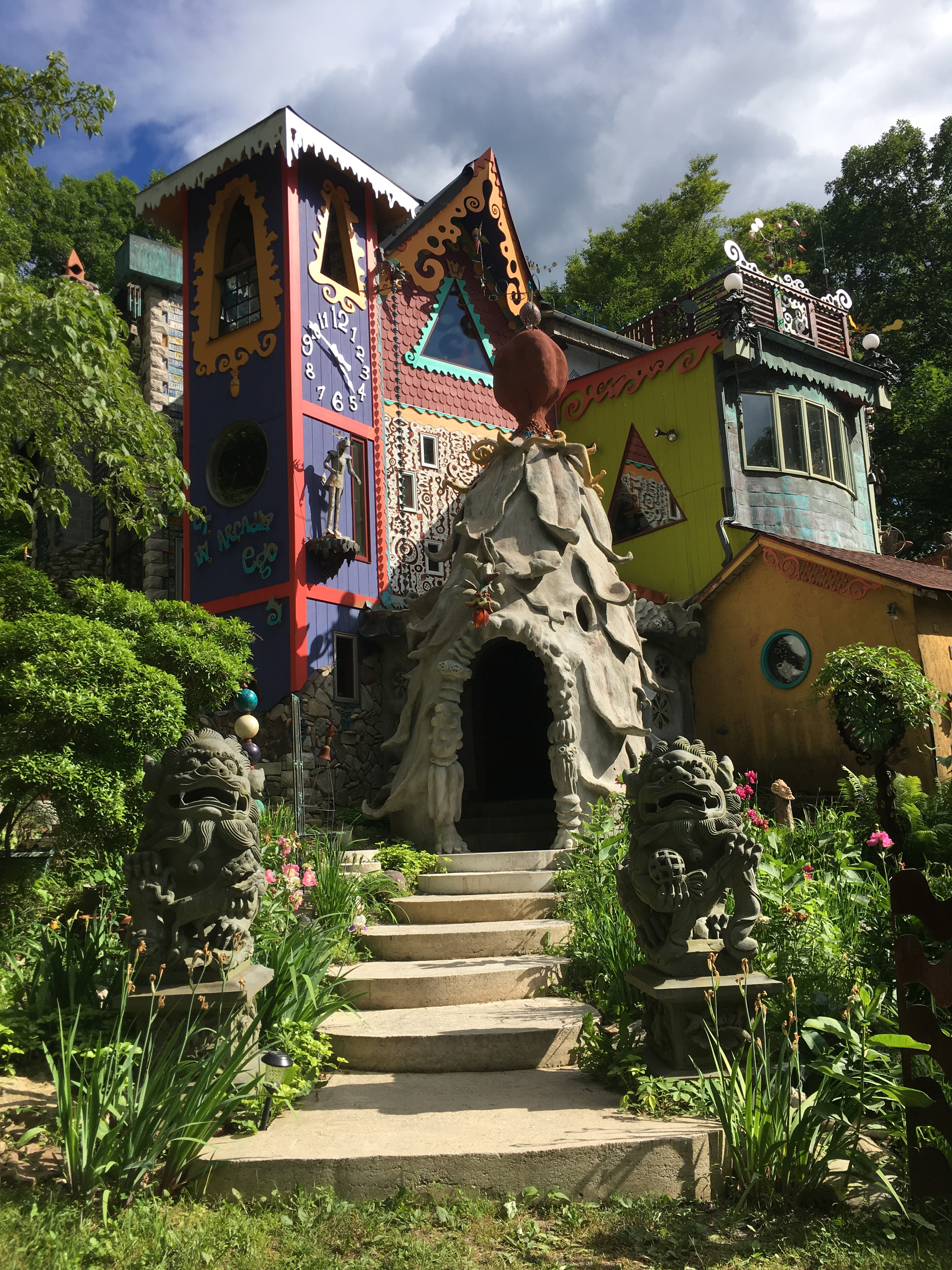
Concrete portico Boscarino built using the ferro-cement technique

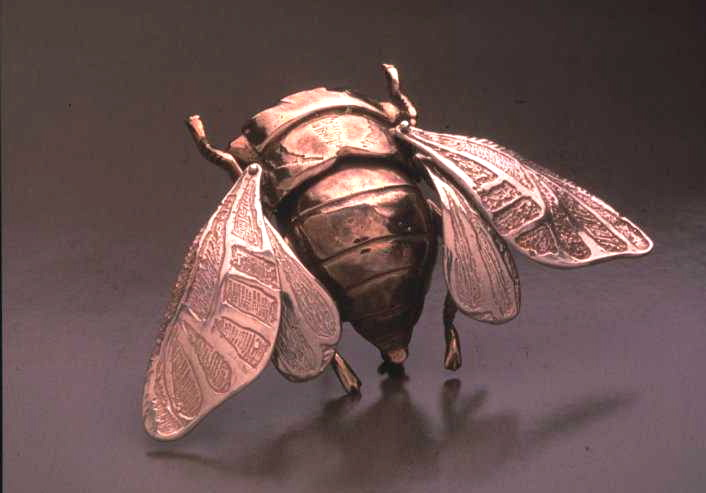
Articulated silver and bronze cicada brooch Boscarino handmade by repoussé method

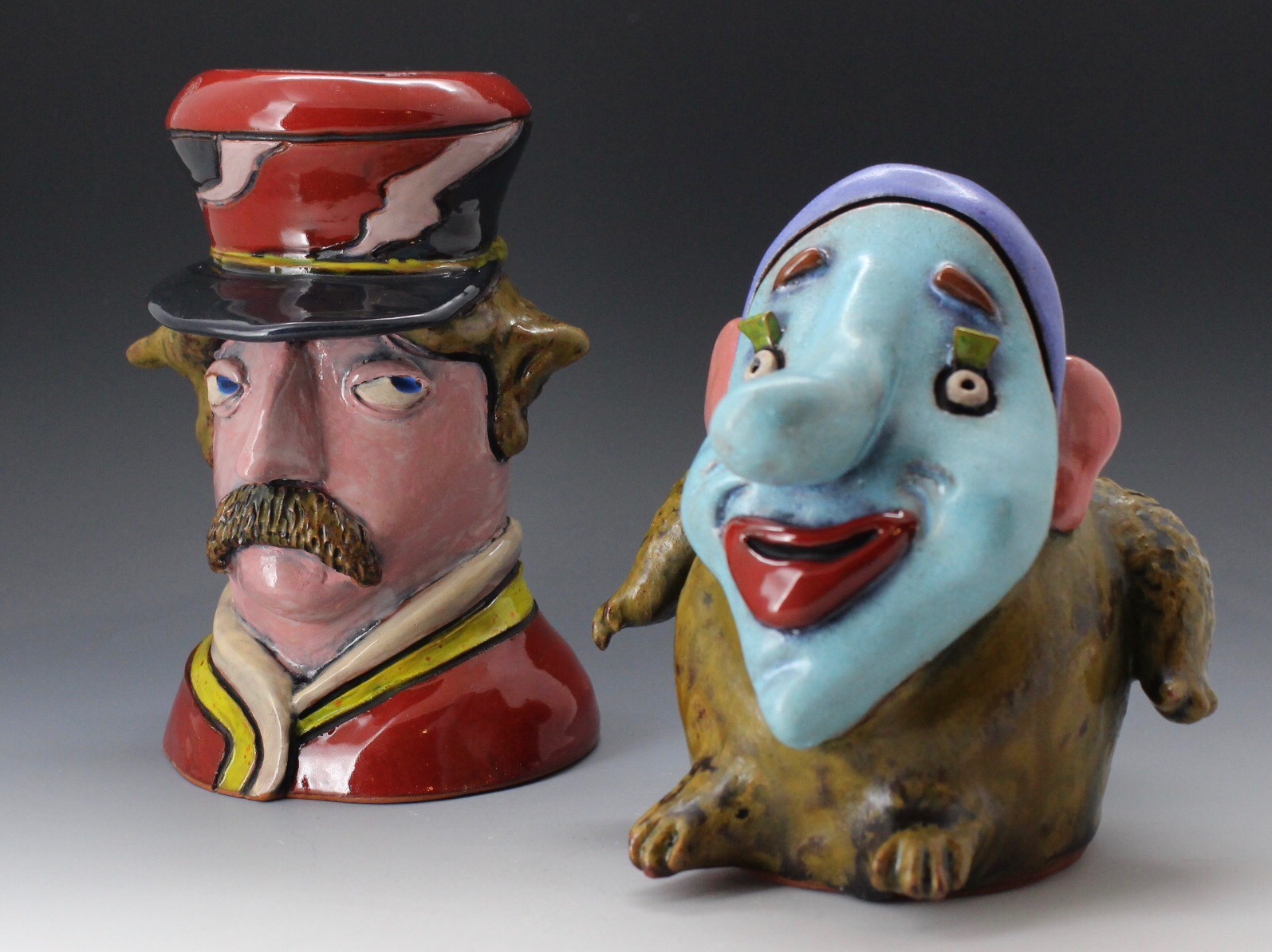
Kiln-fired ceramic vessels Boscarino handcrafted in tradition of Mississippian head pots
