= Plaza Satélite =

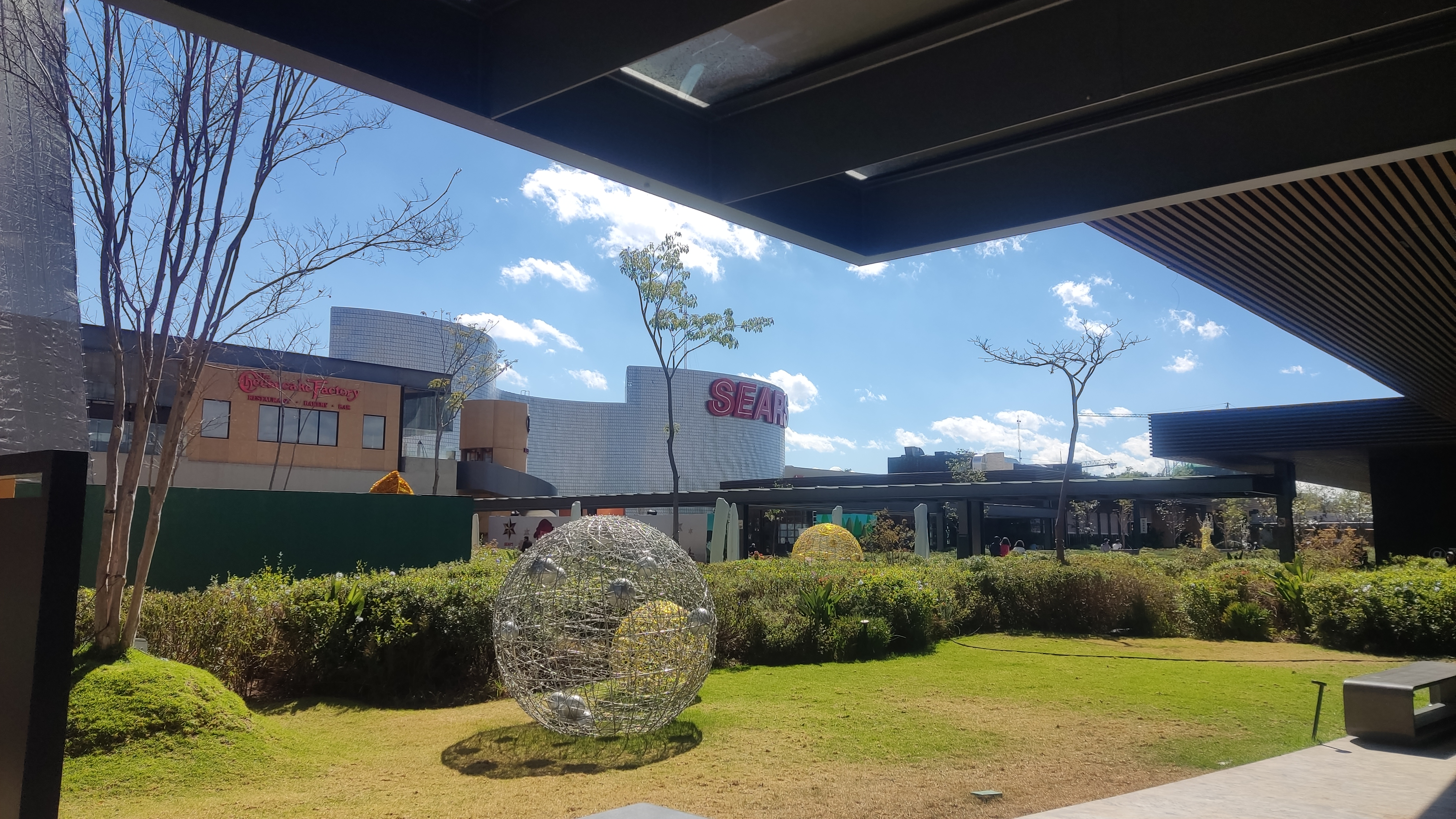

- Location within Mexico City urban area
- Area map

General information
- Location: Circuito Centro Comercial #2251, CD. Satélite C.P. 53100. Naucalpan de Juárez, Edo. de Mex., Mexico, Ciudad Satélite, Naucalpan, State of Mexico (Greater Mexico City), Mexico
- Coordinates: 19.510239°N 99.2342203°W
- Opened: 1971

Other information
- Public transit: Various local routes

Website
- plazasatelite.com.mx

Plaza Satélite is a shopping mall in the northwest part of Greater Mexico City in Ciudad Satélite on the Anillo Periferico ring road. Opened on October 13, 1971, it was Mexico's first American-style shopping mall. It has over 240 stores and services.

== History ==
Plaza Satélite began construction in 1968 in Ciudad Satélite with the blueprints of architect Juan Sordo Madaleno. It was inaugurated on October 13, 1971 with four anchors: Sears, Liverpool, Sanborn's, and París-Londres, with 150 retail units in total including restaurants, banks and the largest movie theater in Latin America with 1,400 seats. At that time it had parking space for 3000 cars.

By 1995 the mall was expanded, doubling in size to 240 commercial spaces. The fast food section was completed, and the movie theaters were completely renovated and expanded into a 15-screen Cinépolis multiplex. The expansion was concluded in 1998 with the addition of a branch of luxury department store El Palacio de Hierro. The parking lot was also expanded to 5472 parking spots, making it, at the time, the largest shopping mall parking lot in Mexico.

In 2018, the mall was expanded to 548,000 square metres (5,900,000 sq ft) including 180,000 square metres (1,900,000 sq ft) of retail space. It was completely redesigned with an airier, more open feel and a large atrium. The orange-colored theme and orange-tinted roof with glass blocks was replaced with a more neutral, contemporary theme of stone, wood, and steel. A park of 40,000 square metres (430,000 sq ft) with a lake was added. All in all, with the expansion, Satélite became the third-busiest mall in Greater Mexico City, behind Multiplaza Aragón and Centro Santa Fe.

In 2021, the plaza replaced 900 parking spots with a green rooftop.
