= Centro Comercial El Parián =

El Parían Shopping Center
- Centro Comercial El Parían
- Address: C. RIVERO Y GUTIÉRREZ 101, ZONA CENTRO, 20000

Centro Comercial El Parian, or simply 'El Parian', is the oldest mall in the city of Aguascalientes, Mexico.

== Location ==
Located in north side of the downtown area, El Parian, which now stands as a three-floor shopping center, once was a main point of sale for farm products.
