= Sears Mexico =

Department store chain in Mexico

Sears Operadora México, S.A. de C.V.

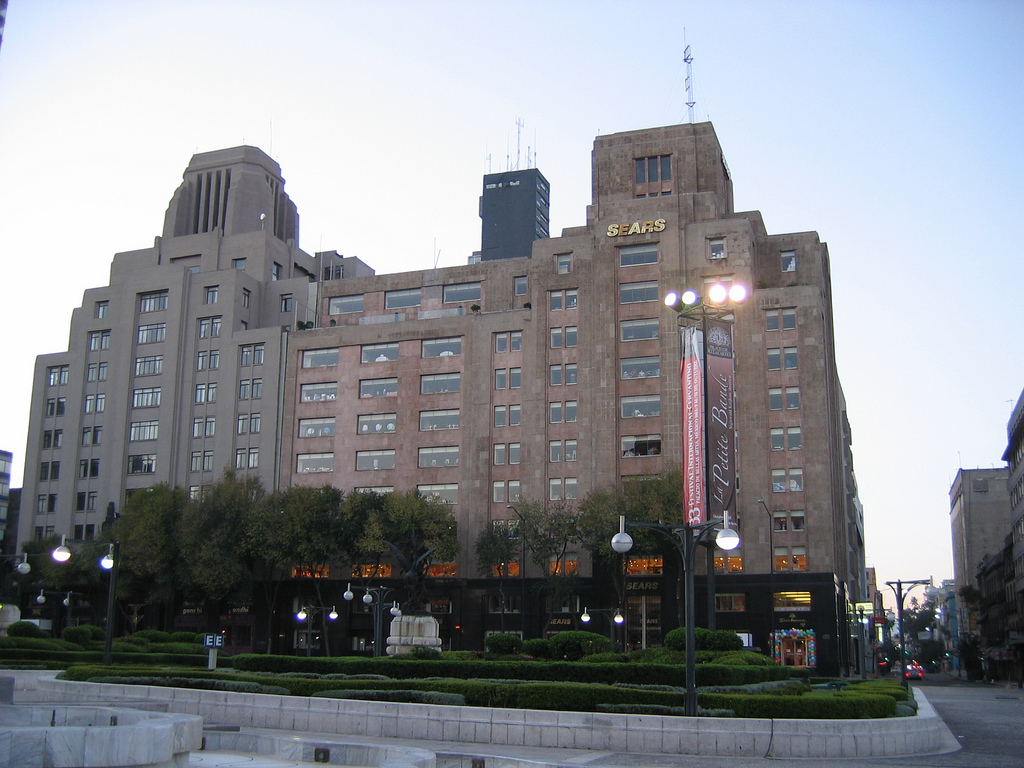
- Sears' freestanding store on Avenida Juárez in Downtown Mexico City.
- Trade name: Sears Mexico
- Type: Subsidiary
- Industry: Retail
- Founded: 26 February 1947; 79 years ago
- Headquarters: Mexico City, Mexico
- Number of locations: 93 (2024)
- Area served: Nationwide
- Products: Consumer goods
- Revenue: MX$25.4 billion (2017)
- Parent: Sears (1947–1997); Grupo Sanborns (1997–present)
- Website: www.sears.com.mx

Sears Operadora México, S.A. de C.V. (Spanish pronunciation: [ˈseaɾs]) is a department store chain located in Mexico, operating 93 stores all over Mexico as of 2024. Sears México is operated by Grupo Sanborns, a division of Grupo Carso.

== History ==
=== Early history ===
On 26 February 1947, the first Sears in Mexico was opened in Colonia Roma, Mexico City (now the site of the Plaza Insurgentes mall) by Sears, Roebuck and Co.

In the initial three days after opening, approximately 110,000 customers visited the store, with total sales reaching about $600,000. During its first week, the store faced challenges in maintaining inventory levels, necessitating the delivery of additional goods via three flights from a Texas warehouse operated by the parent company. The store's entry into the Mexican market has been viewed by some as a catalyst for changing consumer patterns, influencing a shift towards different economic priorities.

In its first year of operation, the Mexico City store did around $16 million in business, almost twice as much as was expected by its parent company. However, just a few months after opening, in order to prevent a drain on the nation's foreign-currency reserves, Mexico barred some nonessential imports and raised tariffs on others. This impacted the Mexico City store, which was at the time importing around 90 percent of its merchandise. This forced the store to create alliances with Mexican manufacturers. It also brought interest in factories that were producing its merchandise. In 1949, Sears México had around 2,500 Mexican suppliers furnishing some 80 percent of the goods in the Mexico City store.

A second and third Sears were opened in 1949 in Monterrey and Guadalajara, and by 1953, Sears had seven stores in Mexico with annual sales of more than $15 million and employed around 1,900 people. These employees received cost-of-living allowances, paid vacations, retirement funds and free medical treatment. In 1956, there were 17 Sears stores in Mexico with a sales volume of around $25 million. There were around 3,200 employees at that time, all but 16 of whom were Mexican citizens. Additionally, about 90 percent of the merchandise sold in its stores was made in Mexico.

=== Grupo Carso ===
The 1994 Sears logo, which is still in use by the Mexican chain today but recolored to red in 2013 to differentiate from its former American parent.

On 2 April 1997, Sears formed a strategic alliance with Grupo Carso, owned by Mexican businessman Carlos Slim Helú, through which it was agreed to sell 85% of Sears México to Grupo Carso, which, as of 2022, owns 100% of the company.

==== Dorian's ====
In 2004, Grupo Carso bought Dorian's Tijuana, S.A. de C.V., a mid-range department store chain present mostly in northwestern Mexico, established in Downtown Tijuana in 1959. Carso operated it as a subsidiary of Inmuebles Borgru, S.A. de C.V., which was in turn a subsidiary of Inmuebles Carso, S.A.B. de C.V. In that same year, Dorian's purchased five department store locations from JCPenney, the U.S.-based retailer which had been operating in Mexico since 1995.

In April 2009, Dorian's brand was jettisoned. As such, 13 of the 14 Dorian's locations were converted to Sears. In Tijuana: three stores Plaza Río Tijuana, Plaza Carrousel in La Mesa, Centro Comercial Mesa de Otay); in Cancún—Plaza Las Américas (formerly JCPenney), in Chihuahua City—Plaza de Sol (formerly JCPenney); Downtown Ensenada; Downtown La Paz and Forjadores La Paz; in León, Guanajuato—Plaza Mayor (formerly JCPenney); in Mérida—Plaza las Américas (formerly JCPenney), in Mexicali—Centro Comercial Cachanilla; in the Monterrey area—San Pedro Garza García (formerly JCPenney and since moved to San Agustín); and a store in San Luis Río Colorado, Sonora (since closed). The exception was Downtown Tijuana Dorian's flagship which was closed in May 2009 and is now the "Plaza de la Tecnología", a market hall of consumer technology vendors.

=== Current status ===
Despite the bankruptcy of its former parent company, the closing of many stores in the United States and Canada, and the subsequent sale to ESL Investments, Sears México still remains open for business due to different ownership.

In July 2021, it was announced that the Mexican company was considering renaming its stores to distance itself from its failing former parent in the United States.

== Locations ==
Sears has 93 stores across the country, including 25 in Greater Mexico City (14 in Mexico City proper, 11 in the suburbs in the State of Mexico). The remaining 68 stores are spread across the country from Tijuana to Cancún, with a presence in all 32 states except Campeche.

In Greater Mexico City, branches are located in the city proper at Portal San Ángel, Parque Via Vallejo in Azcapotzalco, Plaza Universidad, the World Trade Center in Nápoles, Perisur, Centro Santa Fe, Avenida Juárez in the Historic Center, Forum Buenavista, Parque Tepeyac Plaza Insurgentes (Colonia Roma (the first in Mexico, opening in 1947), Plaza Lindavista, Parque Tezontle, Parque Las Antenas in Iztapalapa, Pabellón Polanco, and Galerías Coapa in Tlalpan. In the State of Mexico portion of the metro area, Sears stores are located at Galerías Atizapan, Plaza Chimalhuacan, Zentralia Coacalco, Cosmopol in Coacalco, Mexipuerto Cuatro Caminos, Luna Parc Cuautitlan Izcalli, Plaza las Américas in Ecatepec, Paseo Interlomas, Plaza Ciudad Jardín in Ciudad Nezahualcóyotl, Plaza Satélite and Plaza Tlalne Fashion Mall in Tlalnepantla.

Sears stores in Mexico. On a desktop or laptop, mouse over the push-pin icons to see the store name.
Sears stores in Mexico. On a desktop or laptop, mouse over the push-pin icons to see the store name.
Number of Sears stores by state in Mexico as of January 2024

State	
Aguascalientes	1
Baja California (Norte)	4
Baja California Sur	2
CDMX (Mexico City)	15
Chiapas	1
Chihuahua	2

State	
Coahuila	1
Colima	1
Durango	3
Guanajuato	5
Hidalgo	1
Jalisco	3

State	
State of Mexico	12
of which 11 in the Mexico; City metropolitan area
Michoacán	2
Morelos	2
Nayarit	1
Nuevo León	5

State	
Oaxaca	1
Puebla	2
Querétaro	2
Quintana Roo	2
San Luis Potosi	3
Sinaloa	4

State	
Sonora	1
Tabasco	1
Tamaulipas	2
Veracruz	8
Yucatán	4
Zacatecas	1
