= Sede Café =

Mexican chain of takeaway coffee shops

- Industry: Coffeehouse
- Founded: February 13, 2024; 2 years ago
- Founder: Javier Arrigunaga Palacios; Erick Lankisch Amtmann
- Headquarters: Mexico City, Mexico
- Number of locations: 71 (November 2026)
- Number of employees: 470 (February 2026)

Sede Café is a Mexican chain of takeaway coffee shops based in Mexico City. The first branch opened on February 13, 2024, in Manacar, a new shopping center just north of Coyoacán in the south of the city. By May 2026 there were 59 branches, and by November 2026, 71 branches.

== History ==
Founder and CEO Javier Arrigunaga Palacios got the idea from coffee shops in New York. He had worked in banking and was at one time an intern at Blank Street Coffee, a chain. La Crónica names Erick Lankisch Amtmann as co-founder.

The concept is modeled on the "grab and go" coffee shops of London and New York. Almost everything is sold to take out, and the shops have few tables. The coffee is from Veracruz, Oaxaca and Chiapas, sourced together with the Mexican specialty brand Jiribilla. The slogan is Recoge rapidito, toma despacito ("pick it up quick, drink it slow").

In February 2026 the company had 48 branches and 470 employees. It does not franchise. After Manacar, the chain then expanded in Roma and Condesa, then shopping malls and in other areas such as Vallejo.

In May 2026 Monocle put Sede Café on its list of 25 of the world's best coffee shops.

== Branch coverage ==
As of November 2026, there were 71 branches listed, all in Mexico City except for one in Interlomas in the State of Mexico. Listed by borough or municipality, area or neighborhood, and shopping center (if applicable).

- Cuauhtémoc borough (18)
  - Roma on-street (7)
  - Colonia Juárez (5)
    - On-street (4)
    - Plaza Reforma 222 (1)
  - Colonia Cuauhtémoc on-street (4)
  - Condesa on-street (3)
  - Santa María la Ribera on-street (1)
  - San Rafael on-street (1)
  - Centro Histórico on-street (1)
- Miguel Hidalgo borough (15)
  - Polanco (5)
    - Co-Madre Coworking (1)
    - Corporativo Homero (1)
    - Edificio Polanco (1)
    - On-street (2)
  - Nuevo Polanco/Granada/Anáhuac (5)
    - On-street (3)
    - Parques Polanco (1)
    - Plaza Carso (1)
  - Lomas de Chapultepec (2)
    - Corporativo Palmas on-street (1)
  - Anzures on-street (2)
  - Lomas de Virreyes (1)
    - Torre Virreyes (1)
- Benito Juárez borough (14)
  - Colonia del Valle (6)
    - City Shops del Valle (1)
    - On-street (5)
  - Narvarte Poniente (2)
    - On-street (2)
  - Nápoles (2)
    - On-street (1)
    - World Trade Center Mexico City (1)
  - San Pedro de los Pinos (1)
    - Metrópoli Patriotismo (1)
  - San José Insurgentes on-street (1)
  - Insurgentes Mixcoac (1)
    - Torre Manacar (1)
  - Acacias on-street (1)
- Coyoacán (7)
  - Romero de Terreros (2)
    - Librería El Sótano (1)
    - Oasis Coyoacán (1)
  - Pedregal de Carrasco (1)
    - Plaza Gran Sur (1)
  - Insurgentes Cuicuilco (1)
    - Perisur (1)
  - El Rosario / Coyoacán on-street (1)
  - Copilco Universidad on-street (1)
  - Chimalistac/Oxtopulco on-street (1)
- Álvaro Obregón borough (7)
  - Santa Fe (3)
    - Barrio Santa Fe (1)
    - Park Plaza (1)
    - Samara Shops (1)
  - San Ángel Inn/Altavista on-street (1)
  - Los Alpes (1)
    - Portal San Ángel (1)
  - Jardines del Pedregal (1)
    - Artz Pedregal (1)
  - Guadalupe Inn (1)
    - On-street (1)
- Cuajimalpa (3)
  - Santa Fe (3)
    - On-street (1)
    - Paradox Santa Fe (1)
    - Zentrika (1)
- Tlalpan (2)
  - Toriello Guerra / San Fernando (1)
    - Torre Médica Sur (1)
  - Tlalpan Centro II (1)
    - On-street (1)
- Huixquilucan, State of Mexico (1)
  - Interlomas (1)
    - Parque Interlomas (1)

Branch on Avenida Ámsterdam, Hipódromo, Condesa area (2026)
