= Lago Alberto Assembly =

Lago Alberto Assembly was a Chrysler Corporation automobile factory in the Nuevo Polanco district of Miguel Hidalgo, Mexico City, Mexico. It was built during the 1930s and manufactured Dodge trucks and the Plymouth Savoy.

The factory was idled in 2002, with production shifted to Saltillo Truck Assembly.

It was demolished, and is the present day site of the Parques Polanco project, a mixed-use development.
