= Miyana (Mexico City) =

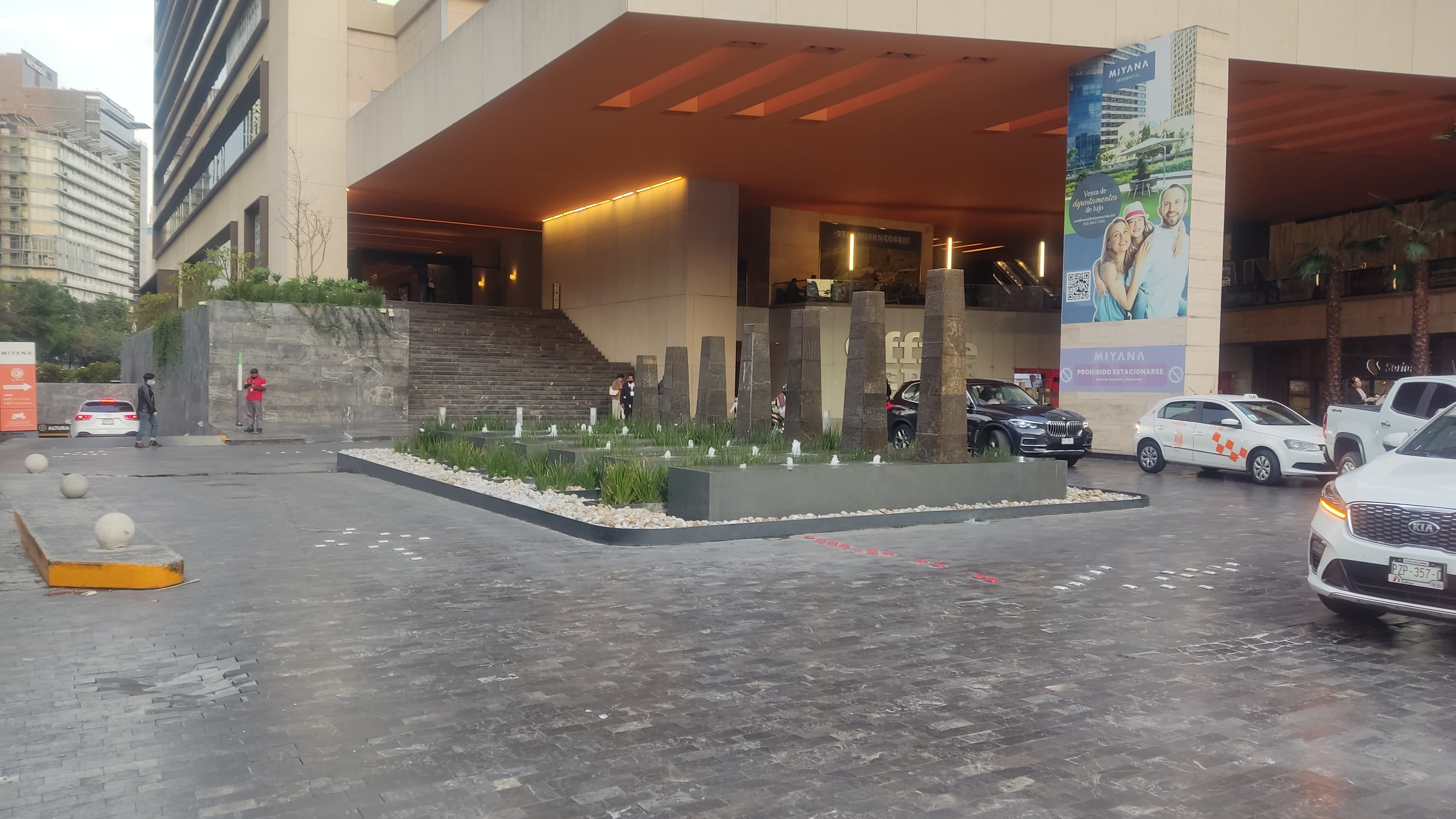

General information
- Location: Avenida Ejército Nacional Mexicano 769, colonia Granada (Nuevo Polanco), Miguel Hidalgo borough, 11520 Mexico City
- Coordinates: 19.4395736°N 99.1998562°W
- Opening: 2016

Technical details
- Floor area: 520,000 square metres (5,600,000 sq ft)

Other information
- Public transit: Polanco and San Joaquín metro stations (both at distance)

Website
- miyanacomercial.com.mx

Miyana is a mixed-use residential and commercial development of Gigante Grupo Mobiliario in Nuevo Polanco district of Mexico City. It is located on a 43,501 square metres (468,240 sq ft) lot with 520,000 square metres (5,600,000 sq ft), making it one of the largest such developments in the metropolis, with an investment of 7 billion pesos (approx. US$400 million).

There are three residential towers which will eventually have over 800 apartments:

- Torre Chapulín, 49 floors, 173.5 m
- Torre Colibri, 37 floors, 130.0 m
- Torre Monarca, 26 floors, 100.0 m

And there are two office towers: Corporativo Miyana with 22 floors and Miyana Etapa 4 with 26 floors, which was completing the complex in 2023.

Commercial anchors of the shopping center include Cinépolis VIP, The Home Depot (since 2023), Office Depot, Petco, Soriana hypermarket, Casaideas (originally The Home Store), Toks restaurant and a food court, "Food Central" with 15 vendors.

In October 2026 a new Intercontinental Hotel celebrated its soft opening.
