= Plaza Carso =

Large mixed-used development in Mexico City, Mexico

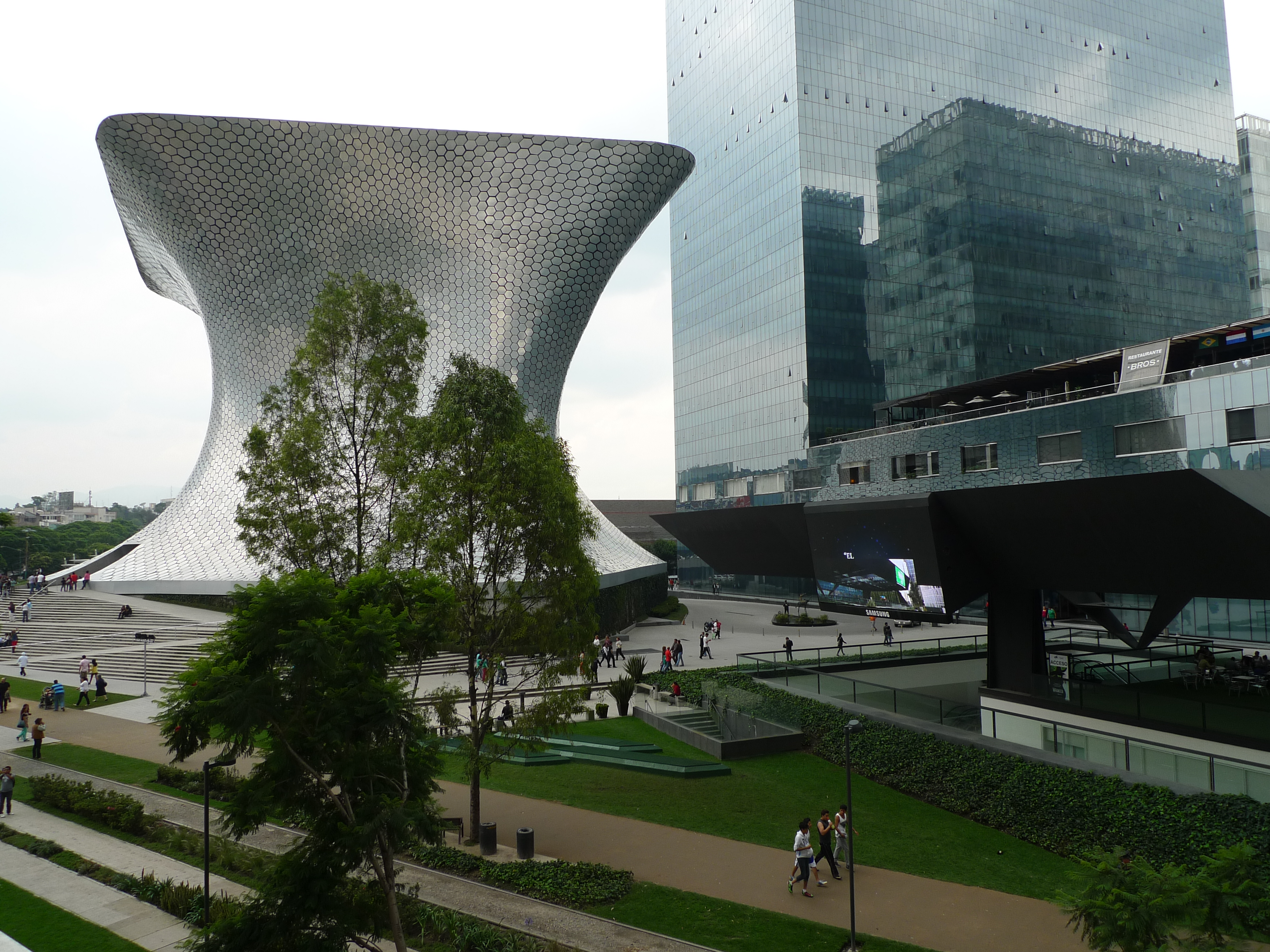
- View from Museo Jumex

General information
- Location: Corner of Lago Zurich and Cervantes Saavedra streets, Nuevo Polanco (officially, colonia Granada). Miguel Hidalgo borough, Mexico City, Mexico.
- Coordinates: 19.441406°N 99.204083°W

Design and construction
- Architect: Fernando Romero (master plan)
- Architecture firm: FR-EE (master plan)

Other information
- Public transit: Polanco and San Joaquín metro stations (both at distance)

Plaza Carso is a large mixed-use development in the Nuevo Polanco area of Miguel Hidalgo, Mexico City, backed by billionaire Carlos Slim. The total cost of the complex is quoted between US$800 million and 1.4 billion. The complex claims to be the largest mixed-use development in Latin America. It was built on the site of a former Vitro glass factory.

The complex includes the following components:

- Museo Soumaya, owned by the Carlos Slim Foundation. The museum contains the Slim's extensive art, religious relic, historical document, and coin collection. The museum holds works by many of the best known European artists from the 15th to the 20th century including a large collection of casts of sculptures by Auguste Rodin. The building is a shiny silver cloud-like structure reminiscent of a Rodin sculpture.
- Museo Júmex, opened November 2013, to house part of the Colección Jumex, the contemporary art collection of the Jumex juice company.
- The Plaza Carso shopping center, which from 2010 through 2020 was home to an 82,500 sq ft (7,665 m^{2}) Saks Fifth Avenue store, the second to have opened in Mexico. Together with the atrium this section measures 48,090 square metres (517,600 ft^{2}).
- Teatro Telcel theatre
- Residential towers: Torre Dalí, Torre Monet and Torre Rodin
- Office towers, two of 23 floors each, and one of 20 floors. The three buildings are joined on the lower 3 levels by an atrium and the shopping center.
  - Torre Telcel - the headquarters of América Móvil are here
  - Torre Falcon
  - Torre Zurich
- A 6-level underground parking garage
