= Acuario Inbursa =

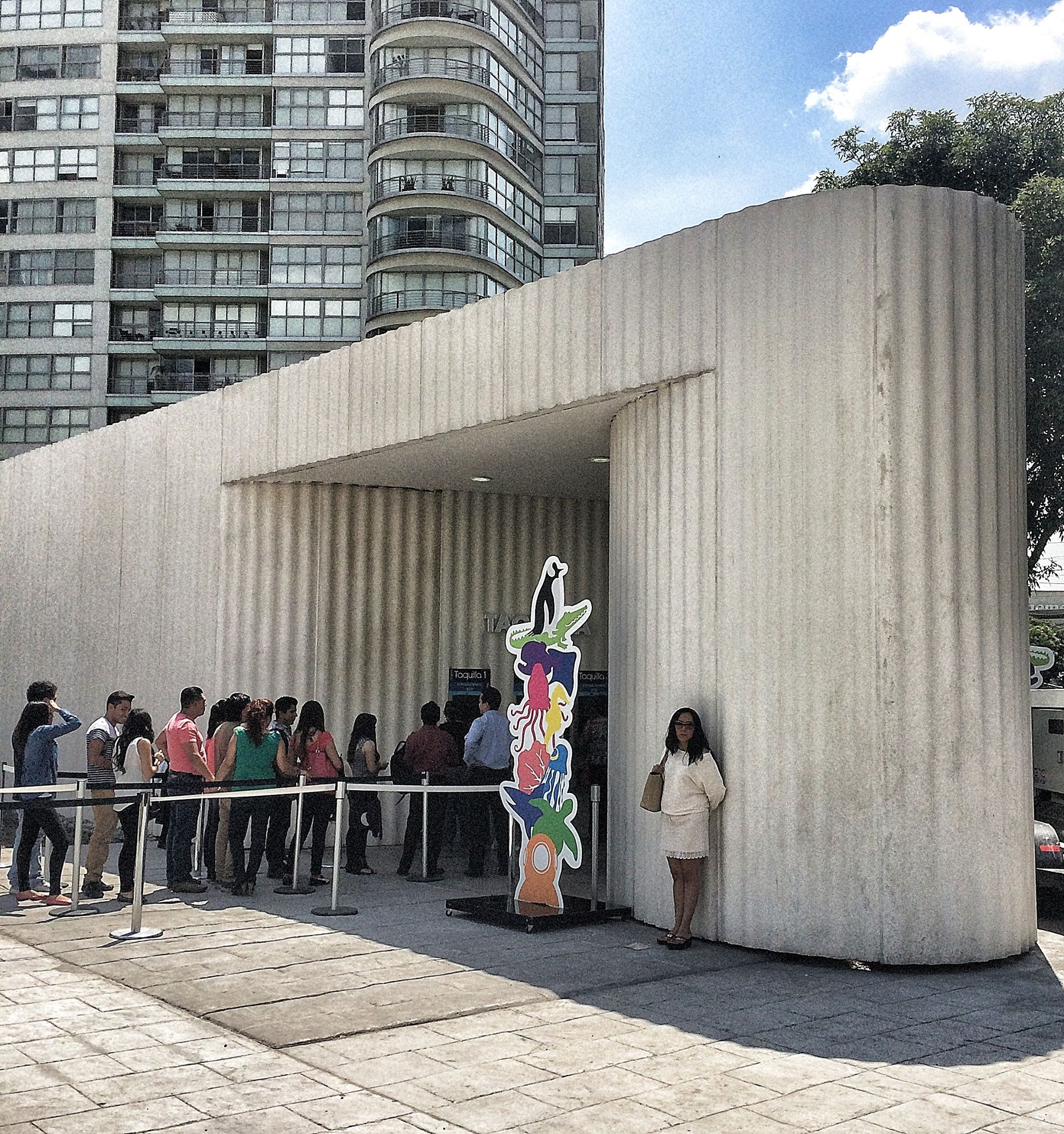
- Acuario Inbursa entrance
- Interactive map of Acuario Inbursa
- 19.4401°N 99.2049°W
- Date opened: 2014
- Location: Mexico City
- Floor space: 3500 square meters
- No. of animals: 3000
- No. of species: 230
- Total volume of tanks: 1.6 million liters
- Owner: Carlos Slim
- Management: Ventura Entertainment
- Website: www.acuarioinbursa.com.mx

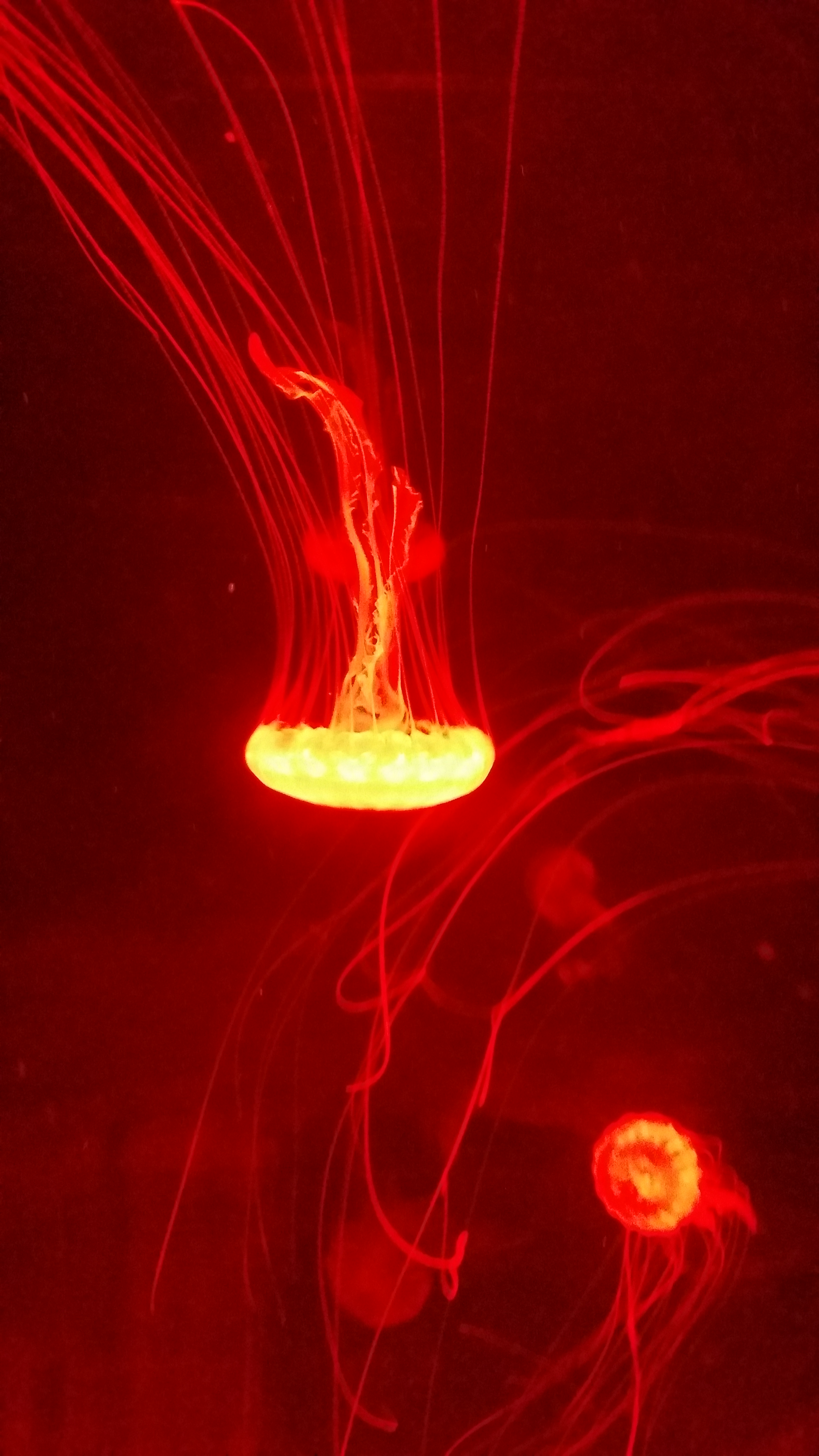
Sea nettle in the subaquatic tunnel

The Acuario Inbursa is an aquarium in the Nuevo Polanco area of Miguel Hidalgo district, Mexico City.

It is the largest in Mexico with 3500 square meters of exhibition space and 1.6 million liters of ocean water. The project of billionaire Carlos Slim, it cost 250 million Mexican pesos, or 19 million US dollars, to build. It opened in June 2014 with 3000 animals of 230 different species, with plans by the end of the year to have 10,000 animals of over 300 species.

The building has 5 stories of which 4 are underground. Some Mexican press articles claim the aquarium as the largest in Latin America, however the National Aquarium of Dominican Republic is much larger at 34,500m^{2}, and the AquaRio in Rio de Janeiro has a larger volume of water and number of species.
