= MagicSnow =

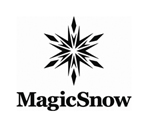
- Type: Private
- Industry: Entertainment
- Founded: 2002
- Headquarters: Los Angeles, California, USA
- Key people: Adam Williams (Founder & President)
- Website: magicsnow.com

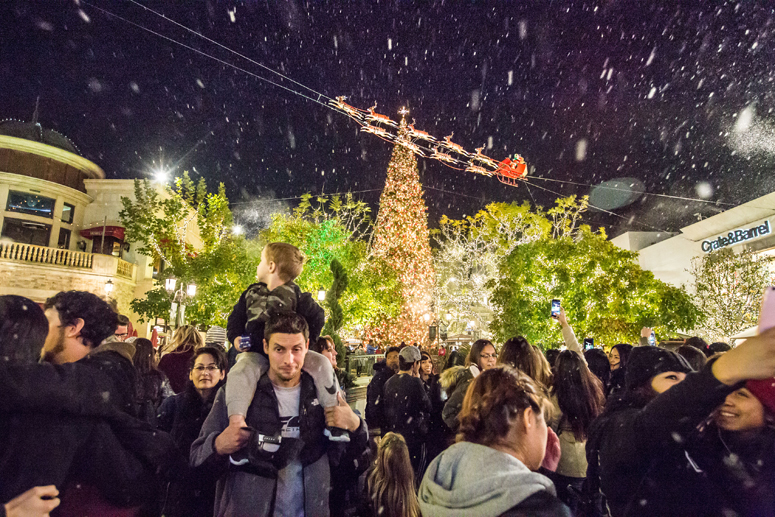
The MagicSnow production at The Grove in Los Angeles.

MagicSnow is a production company that specializes in the design and development of artificial snow and snow making technology for the entertainment industry. The company was founded by Adam Williams in 2002 and is based in Los Angeles.

MagicSnow has developed snow themed projects for Walt Disney Parks & Resorts, Universal Studios Theme Park, Mattel, Princess Cruises, The Cosmopolitan of Las Vegas, and the Christmas Spectacular Starring the Radio City Rockettes.

The company developed a proprietary snow making process for the Disneyland Resort attraction "Olaf's Snow Fest".

MagicSnow is also known for creating holiday 'snow shows' at shopping centers like The Grove at Famer's Market, Ala Moana Center, Toronto Eaton Centre, Antara Polanco, Pacific Place Jakarta, Shopping West Plaza Sao Paulo, Time Warner Center and CentrO Oberhausen, which create snowfall illusions.

== Awards ==
MagicSnow, along with Queen Ka'ahumanu Center, was recognized by the International Council of Shopping Centers with a MAXI Gold award for bringing snow to the island of Maui for the 'Let It Snow' campaign.
