= Javier Sordo Madaleno =

Mexican architect

Javier Sordo Madaleno Bringas
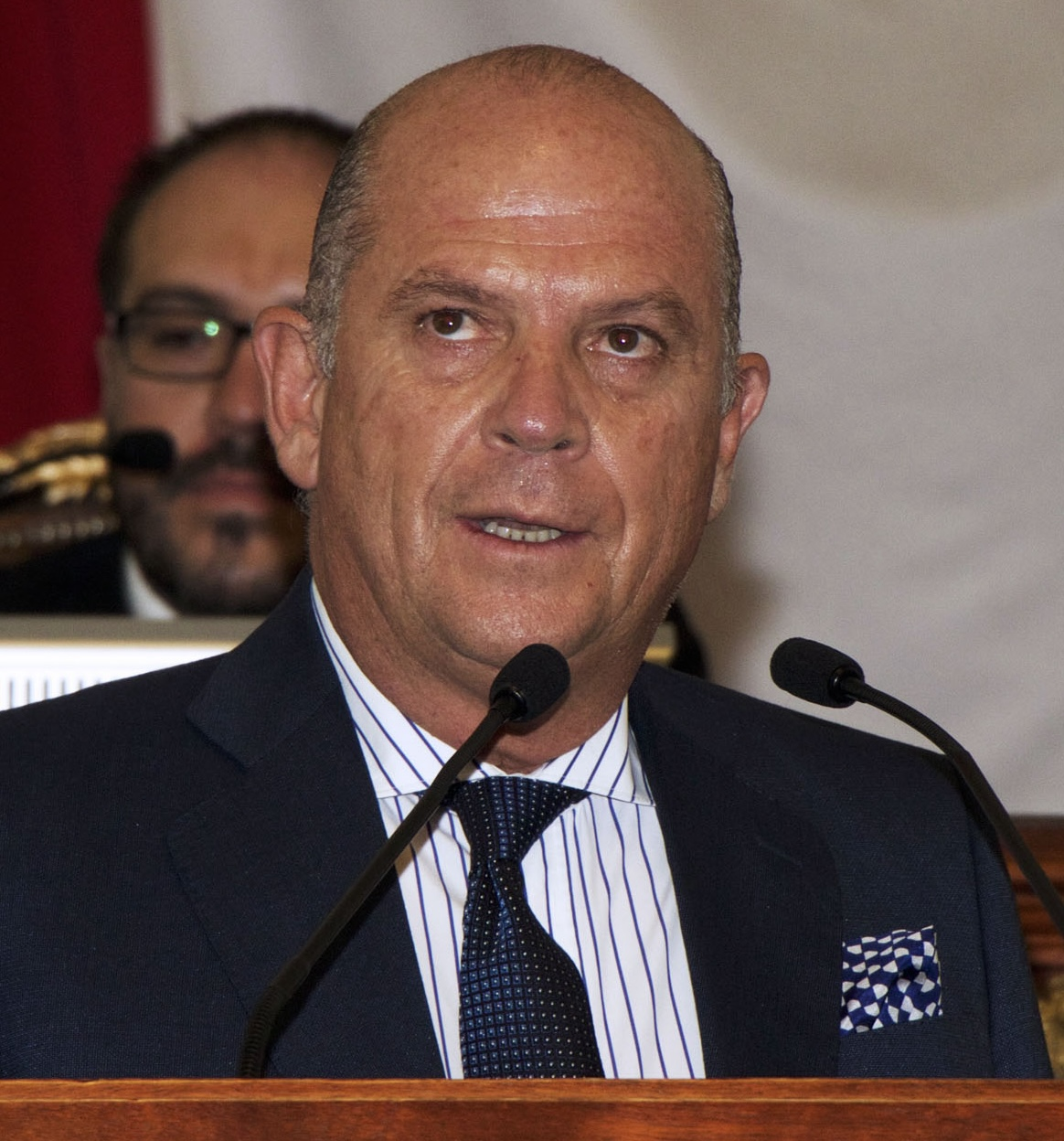
- Madaleno in May 2017, receiving the Medalla al Mérito en Artes (arts medallion award) from the Mexico City legislature
- Born: October 16, 1956 (age 69); Mexico City, Mexico
- Education: Universidad Iberoamericana
- Occupations: Architect, developer
- Parent: Juan Sordo Madaleno
- Practice: Sordo Madaleno Arquitectos

Javier Sordo Madaleno Bringas (born October 16, 1956) is a Mexican architect, son of Juan Sordo Madaleno, also a renowned architect. Today, he leads SOMA with what SOMA describes as a "global perspective and a visionary mindset".

Born in Mexico City in 1956, Javier Sordo Madaleno Bringas is a renowned architect and developer, winner of numerous awards and distinctions from prominent architecture and real estate associations, both nationally and internationally. Sordo studied at the Faculty of Architecture of the Universidad Iberoamericana from 1974 to 1979.

Over the past four decades, Sordo Madaleno has left what SOMA terms "a significant mark on the built environment, applying innovative design concepts that have not only improved people's quality of life, but also contributed to the economic well-being of communities in which he has intervened". His career spans approximately 250 designed projects, the construction of more than nine million square meters and the development of around three million square meters.

== Organizations ==
Sordo is a member of:

- College of Architects of Mexico
- Society of Mexican Architects
- Mexican National Academy of Architecture
- Association of Real Estate Developers (ADI)
- Teletón (Mexico) Board of Trustees
- Honorary member of the American Institute of Architects (AIA)

== Works ==
Sordo has designed several large shopping malls in the 2000s and 2010s including:

- Artz Pedregal in Pedregal, Mexico City
- Antara Polanco, Mexico City
- Toreo Parque Central, Mexico City/Naucalpan border
- Plaza Universidad, Coyoacán, Mexico City
- Angelópolis, Puebla (city)
- Antea LifeStyle Center, Querétaro (city)
- Andamar, Veracruz (city)

== Awards & Recognition ==
Sordo's awards include:

- Named Emeritus Academician by the Mexican National Academy of Architecture (2019)
- First place in the category “Residential for Future Projects” with the project Amelia Tulum at the World Architecture Festival (2018)
- Appointed Honorary Fellow of the American Institute of Architects for significant contribution to architecture and society (2017)
- Medal for Merit in Arts and Sciences in the Architecture category by the Legislative Assembly of Mexico City (2016)
- Award for outstanding career in Architecture by the Real Estate Developers Association (2016)
- “Best of the Year” award from Interior Design magazine for the Grand Hyatt Playa del Carmen's SPA (2015)
- “Trayectorias” prize from the Colegio de Arquitectos de la Ciudad de México (2013)
- “Judges Special Award” by the Design and Health International Academy for the CRIT project in Tampico (2010)
- “Best building” in the health category for the CRIT project in Tampico at the World Architecture Festival in Barcelona (2009)
- “Gold Award for Development and Design Excellence” granted by the ICSC in recognition of the innovative nature of the Andares project (2009)
