= Antara Polanco =

Antara Fashion Hall
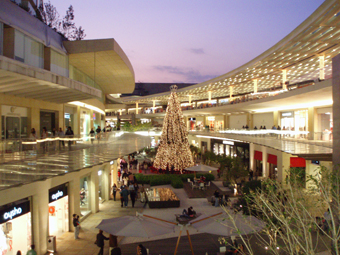

General information
- Location: Nuevo Polanco (Colonia Granada), Mexico City, Mexico
- Coordinates: 19°26′21″N 99°12′09″W
- Opening: May 2006

Technical details
- Floor count: 3
- Floor area: 550,000 sq ft (51,000 m^{2})

Design and construction
- Architect: Javier Sordo Madaleno
- Developer: Grupo Integral de Desarrollo Inmobiliario S de RL de CV (GIDI)

Other information
- Number of stores: 140+
- Public transit: Polanco and San Joaquín metro stations (both at distance)

Website
- www.antara.com.mx

Antara, previously branded as Antara Polanco and Antara Fashion Hall, is an upscale open-air shopping center in the Nuevo Polanco section of the upscale district of Polanco, Mexico City. It hosts a concentration of boutiques of global luxury brands and is anchored by a Casa Palacio department store and a Cinemex multicinema.

== Background ==
The Antara Polanco shopping center, as it was then branded, opened its doors in 2006. Two years after the opening, phase 2 of the development project was launched with the construction of two office buildings behind the mall.

In 2015, Mexico's 500th Starbucks opened in Antara Polanco. In 2018, the mall's Cinemex was the first movie theater in Latin America to use Samsung's LED screen Onyx. In September 2019, Mexico City's second Apple Store opened in Antara Polanco. In September 2020, a customer caused a stir by bringing her pet tiger with her to the mall. In 2021, Dyson announced the opening of its first store in Latin America in Antara Polanco.

== Description ==
The center was designed by the Mexican architect Javier Sordo Madaleno. The mall hosts concerts, fashion shows, and exhibitions throughout the year. It has three levels and is home to over 100 stores including anchor Casa Palacio (a high-end department store of the Palacio de Hierro chain limited to furniture and home furnishings), 6 gourmet restaurants, a fast-food court, a casino, and a Cinemex movie theater. It was built on the site of a demolished General Motors factory.
