= Parques Polanco =

Building complex in Polanco, Mexico City

Coordinates: 19°26′25″N 99°11′4″W

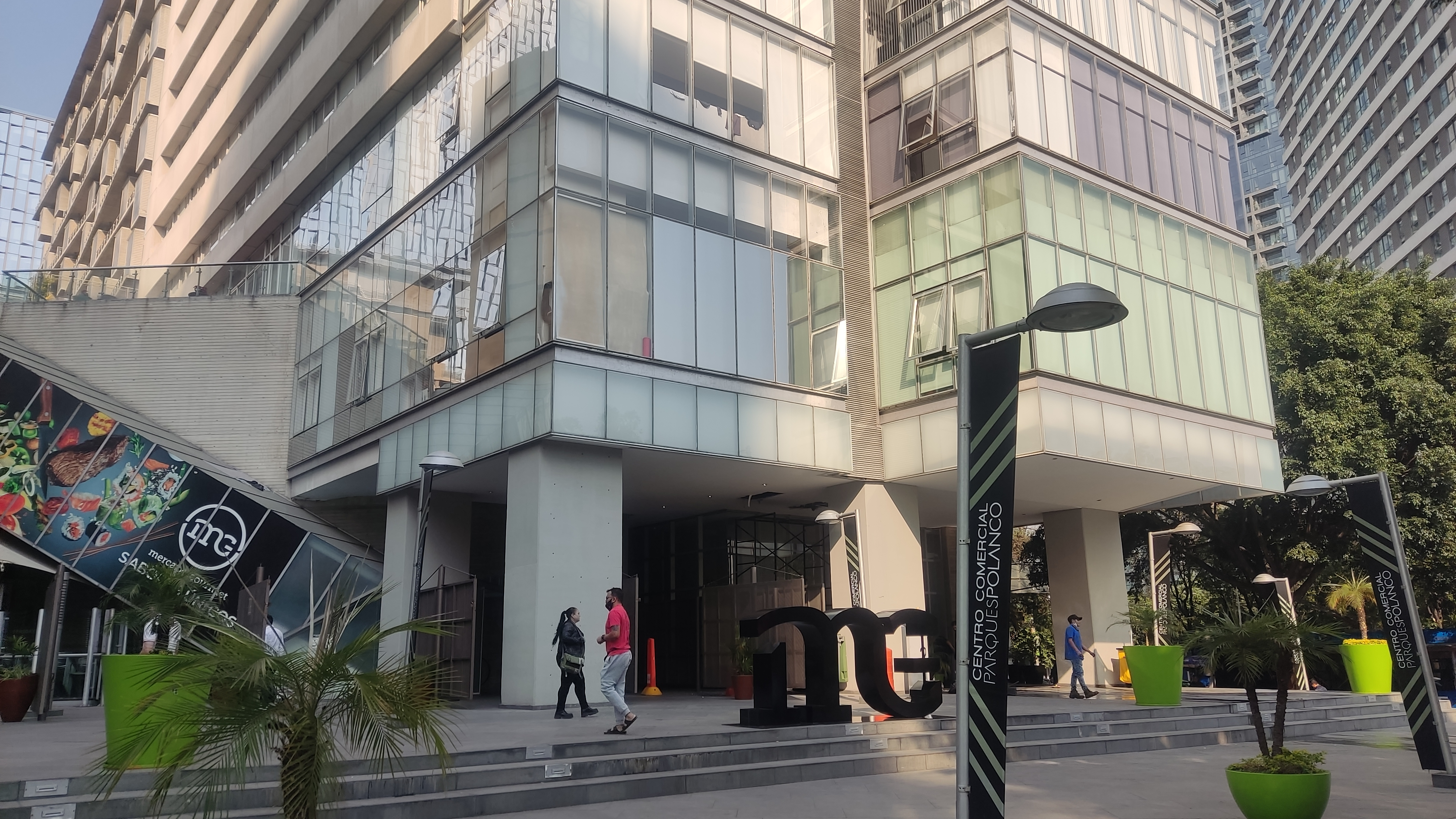
Main entrance

Parques Polanco is a 16,924-square-metre (4.182-acre) mixed-use development in Mexico City at Lago Alberto street #320, Colonia Granada in the new business and residential area of Nuevo Polanco, Mexico City. It was built on the site of Fábricas Automex/Lago Alberto Assembly, a Chrysler assembly plant. The complex includes:

- in Phase I, 5 apartment complexes designed by Higuera + Sánchez, A5 Arquitectura, Ten Arquitectos y KMD México
- in Phase II, two towers designed by Edmonds Internacional.
- in Phase III and IV two towers designed by Arditti Arquitectos
- a retail area with banks, restaurants, shops and a large Sport City gym
- a central park designed by Kees Van Rooij, winner of the AMDI 2010 award in the landscape architecture category
- the 32-story, 449-foot (137 m) BBVA Bancomer back office building (under construction)

The complex has received 2nd place award in the XVIII edition of the "Premio Obras Cemex" awards in the category "Commercial and Mixed Use" (Comercial y de Usos Mixtos).

== Ownership ==
Parques Polanco is a project of Abilia, which is part of Tresalia Capital, part of the business empire of Mexican billionaire María Asunción Aramburuzabala.
