= Artz Pedregal =

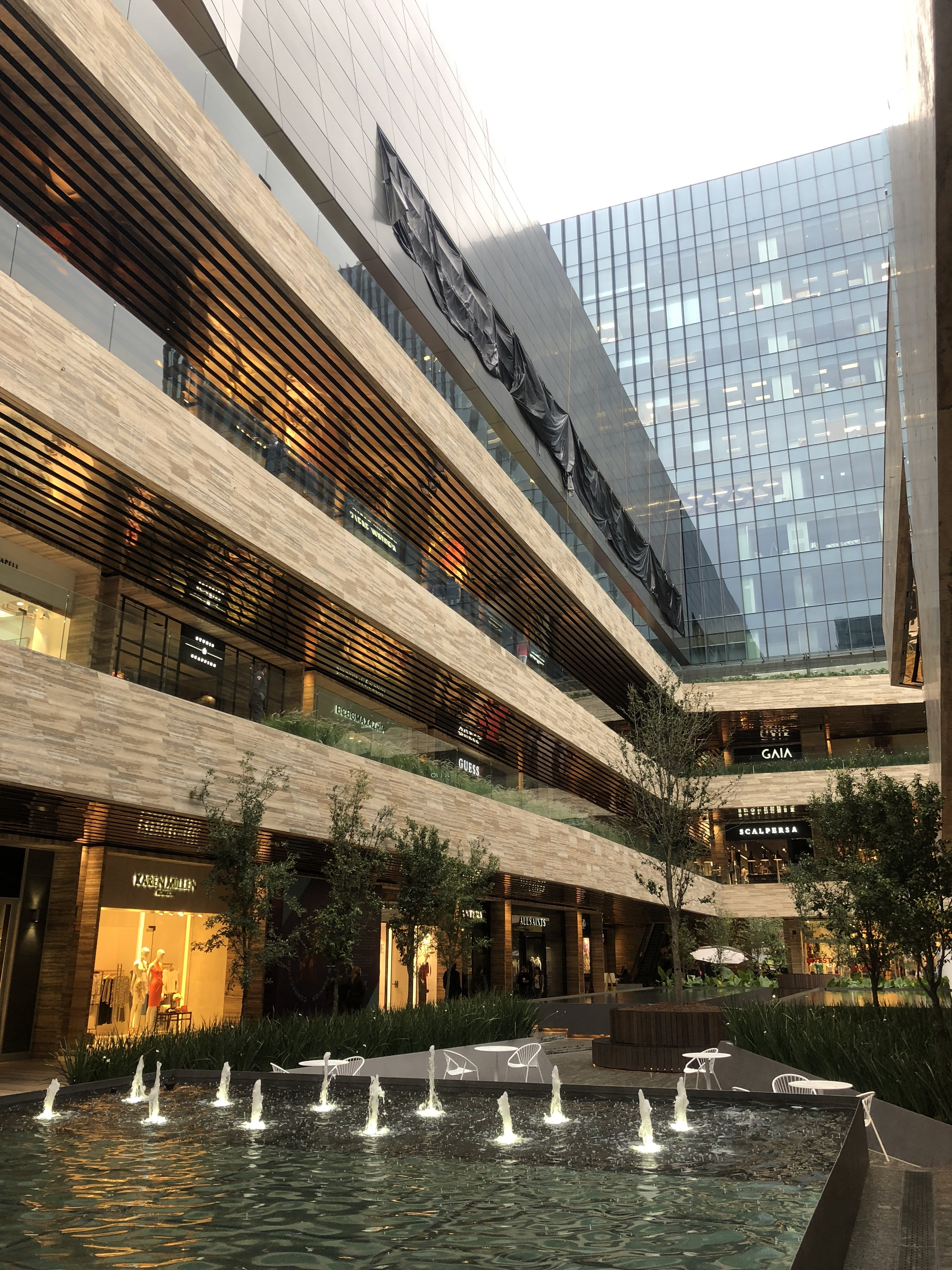
- First floor fountain
- Location: Jardines del Pedregal, Álvaro Obregón borough, Mexico City, Mexico
- Address: Periférico Sur, Jardines del Pedregal, 01900 Ciudad de México, CDMX
- Opened: March 9, 2018
- Developer: Sordo Madaleno Arquitectos
- Architect: Javier Sordo Madaleno
- Parking: Parking garage
- Website: artzpedregal.mx

Artz Pedregal
- Location within Mexico City urban area Location within Mexico

General information
- Coordinates: 19.3135702°N 99.2192667°W

Artz Pedregal is a mixed-use development opened on March 9, 2018 and is located along the Anillo Periférico ring road in the Pedregal de San Ángel area of southwestern Mexico City. The shopping mall focuses on luxury retailers. The project is 400,000 square metres (4,300,000 sq ft) in area: 100,000 square metres (1,100,000 sq ft) of office space, 65,000 square metres (700,000 sq ft) of commercial space and 5,000 square metres (54,000 sq ft) of park space, on a lot of 50,500 square metres (544,000 sq ft). It features a gallery of large-scale installations of public art, and was designed by Sordo Madaleno Arquitectos. Tenants include luxury retailers Louis Vuitton, Dior, Hermes, Gucci, Prada, Fendi, and Cartier, as well as Hamley's toys, Roche Bobois West Elm, Cinemex multicinemas, and Mexico's first Starbucks Reserve Bar. No major department stores anchor the mall. On July 12, 2018, a constituent building of the mall collapsed.

== Public art ==
Public art featured includes Forever by Ai Weiwei, De la rotonda a la fuente. 5 colores para México, trabajo in situ. México 2018. Homenaje al Arquitecto Manuel Tolsá ("From the roundabout to the fountain. 5 colors for Mexico, in situ work. Mexico City 2018. Memorial to architect Manuel Tolsá") by Daniel Buren, and Quisco sonoro by Tania Candiani.

== Gallery ==
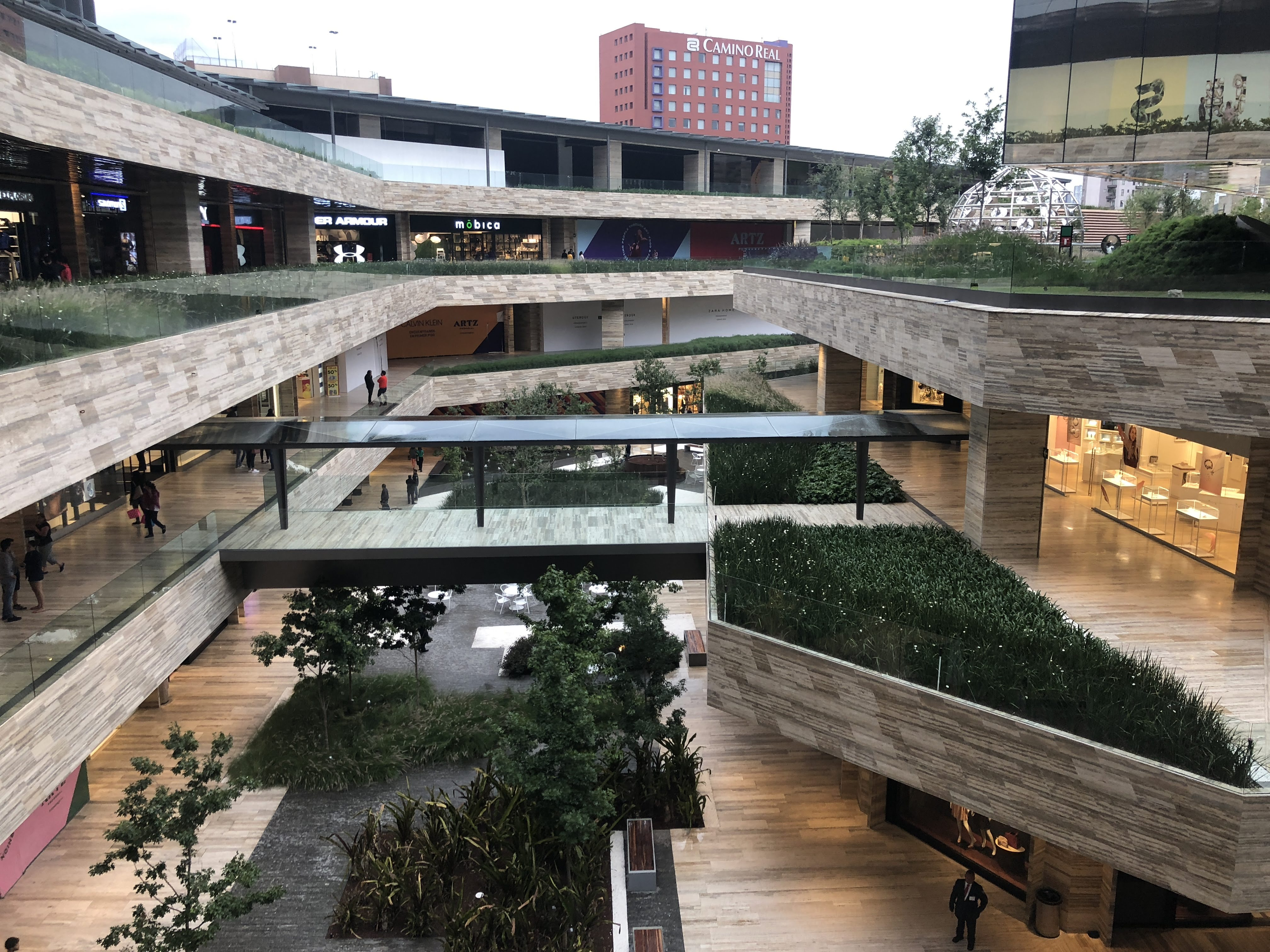
View from second floor

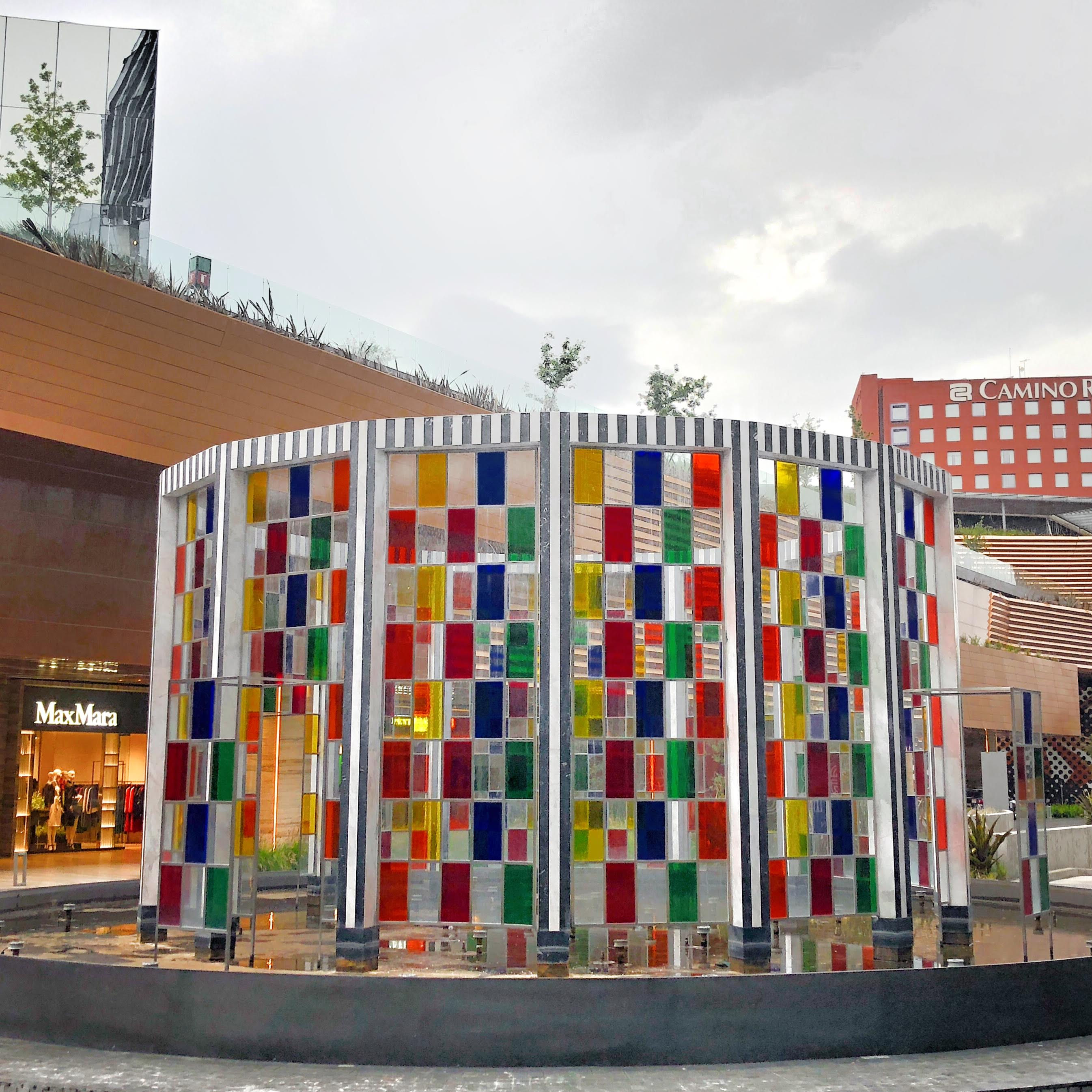
Sculpture De la rotonda a la fuente ("From the roundabout to the fountain") by Daniel Buren at valet parking area, ground floor

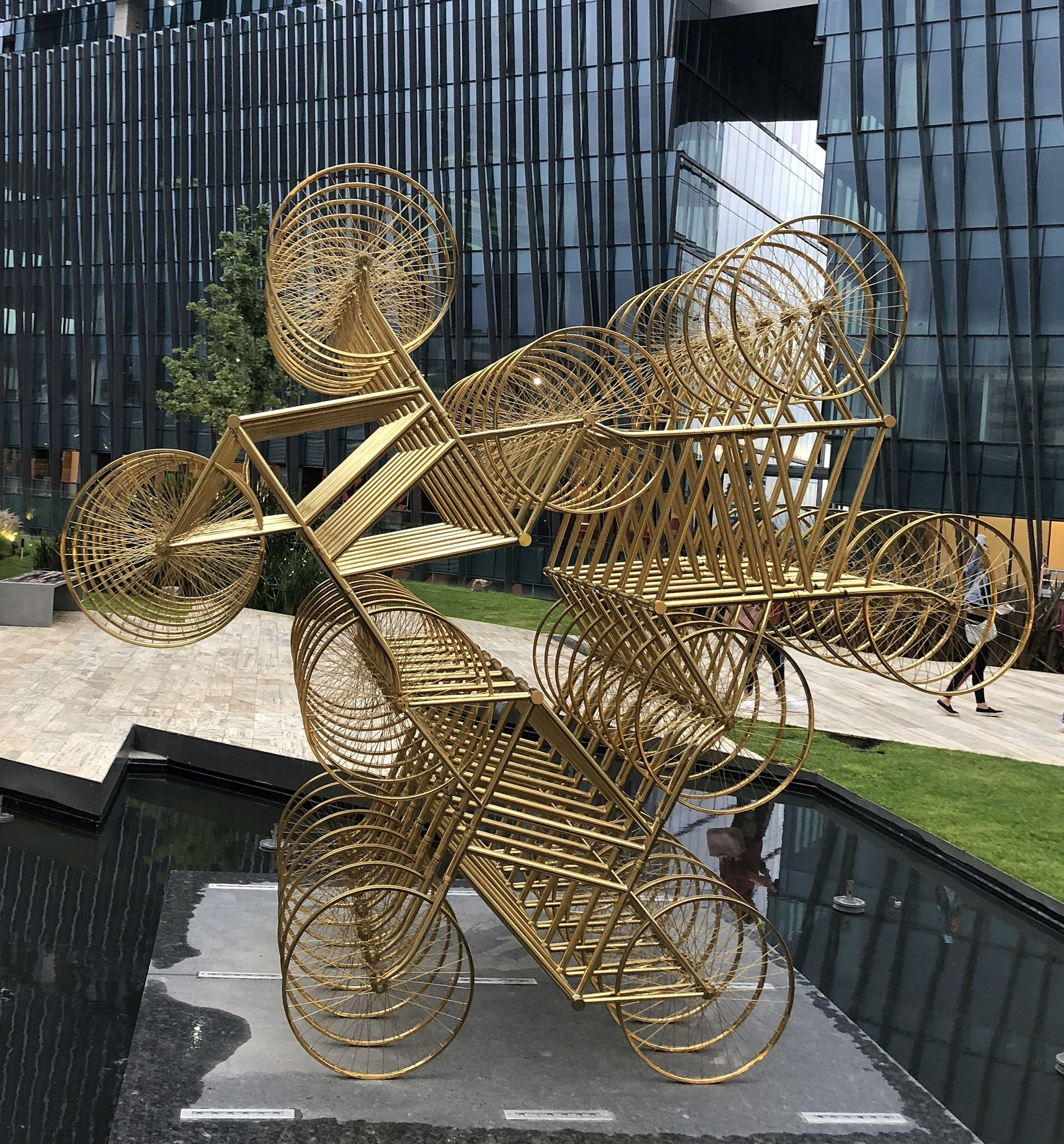
Sculpture Forever by Ai Weiwei on third floor

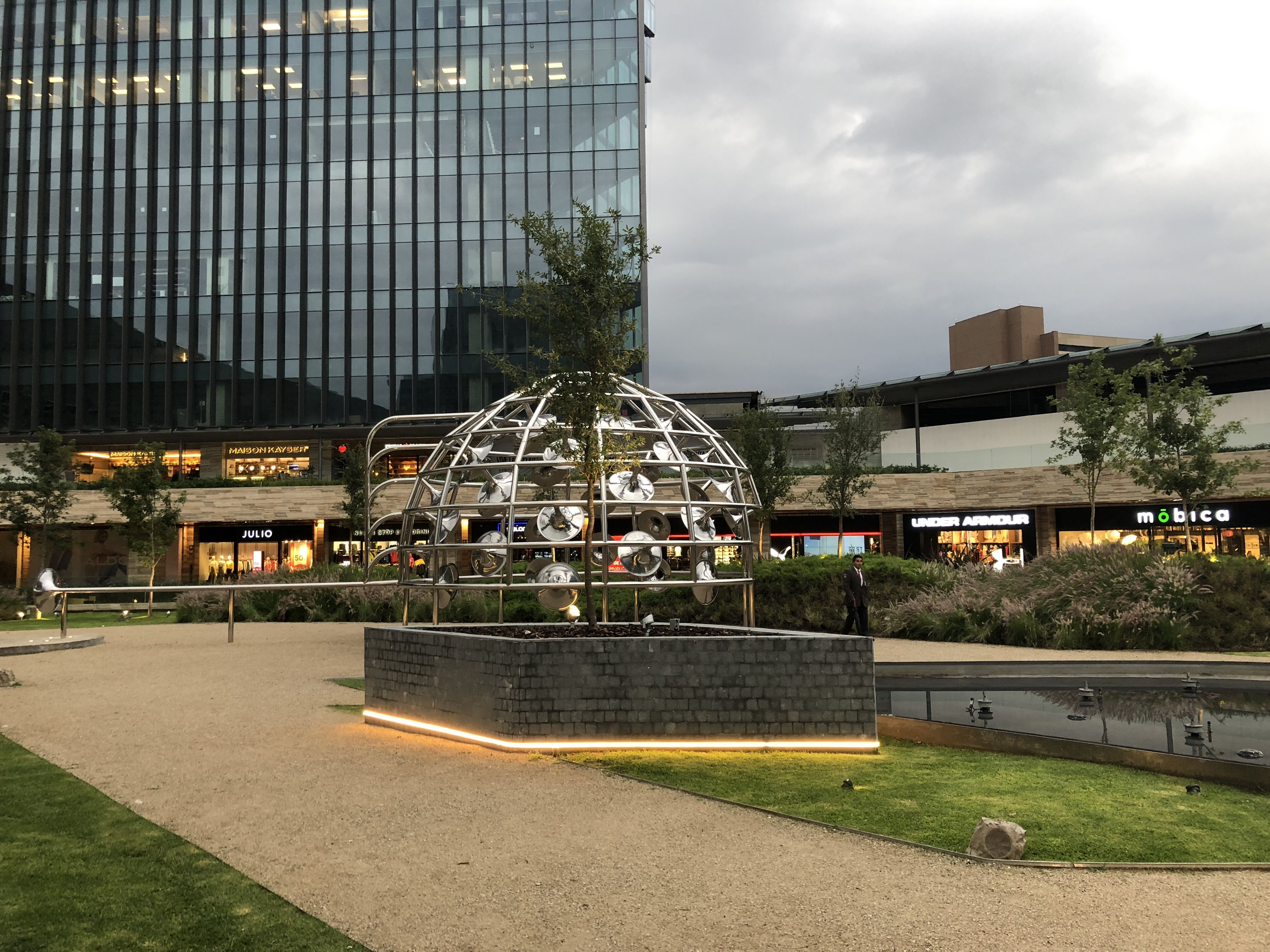
Gardens and sculpture Quisco sonoro ("Sound kiosk") by Tania Candiani, third floor
