= Nuevo Polanco =

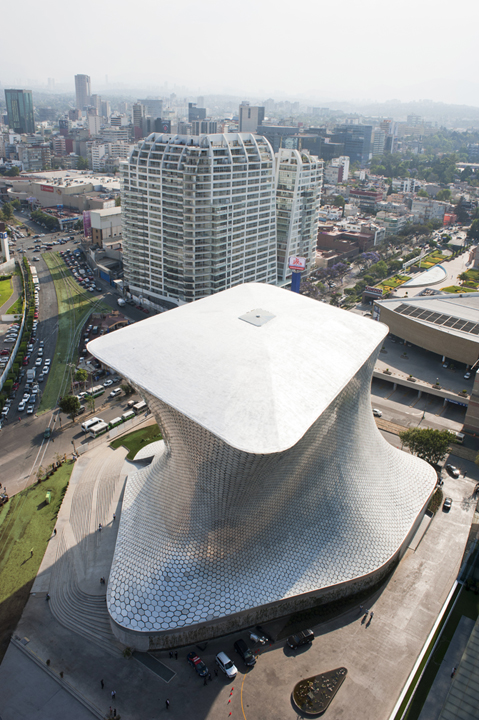
- Museo Soumaya Plaza Carso. Behind, Grand Polanco apartment complex
- Location in Mexico City
- Coordinates: 19.440693°N 99.2047°W
- Country: Mexico
- Federal entity: Mexico City
- Borough: Miguel Hidalgo
- Colonias: Granada, Ampliación Granada

Population (2013)
  - Total: 76,000

Nuevo Polanco (English, "New Polanco") is an area of Mexico City formerly consisting of warehouses and factories, bordering the upscale Polanco on the north across Avenida Ejército Nacional. Officially it consists of two colonias, Granada and Ampliación Granada.

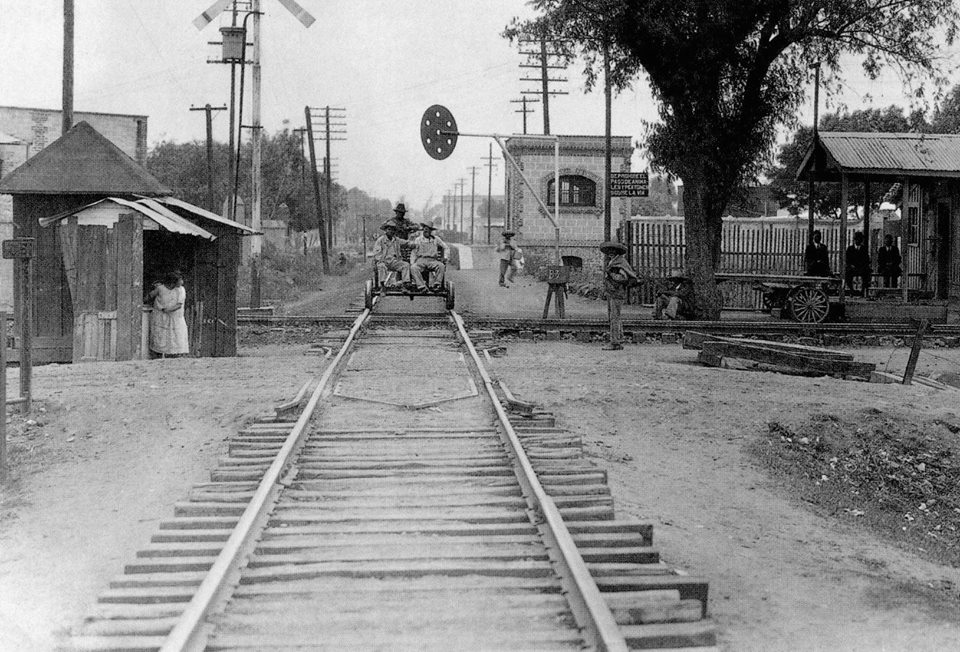
Railroad to Cuernavaca crossing Marina Nacional, 1910s.

The area is undergoing redevelopment, with former industrial sites being converted into residential, commercial and cultural spaces. These developments include apartments, offices, shops, restaurants, cinemas, museums, hotels and a theatre. Some developments have incorporated the name "Polanco" into their branding.

In October 2013, the Secretariat of Urban Development and Housing (SEDUVI) put a stop to further development until a master plan for dealing with the infrastructure problems was approved. At that time the population of Nuevo Polanco was 76,000, twice as high as originally foreseen, with 23,469 housing units. Nuevo Polanco had gained attention in the international press as an example of how development can go wrong if there is no proper planning for infrastructure.

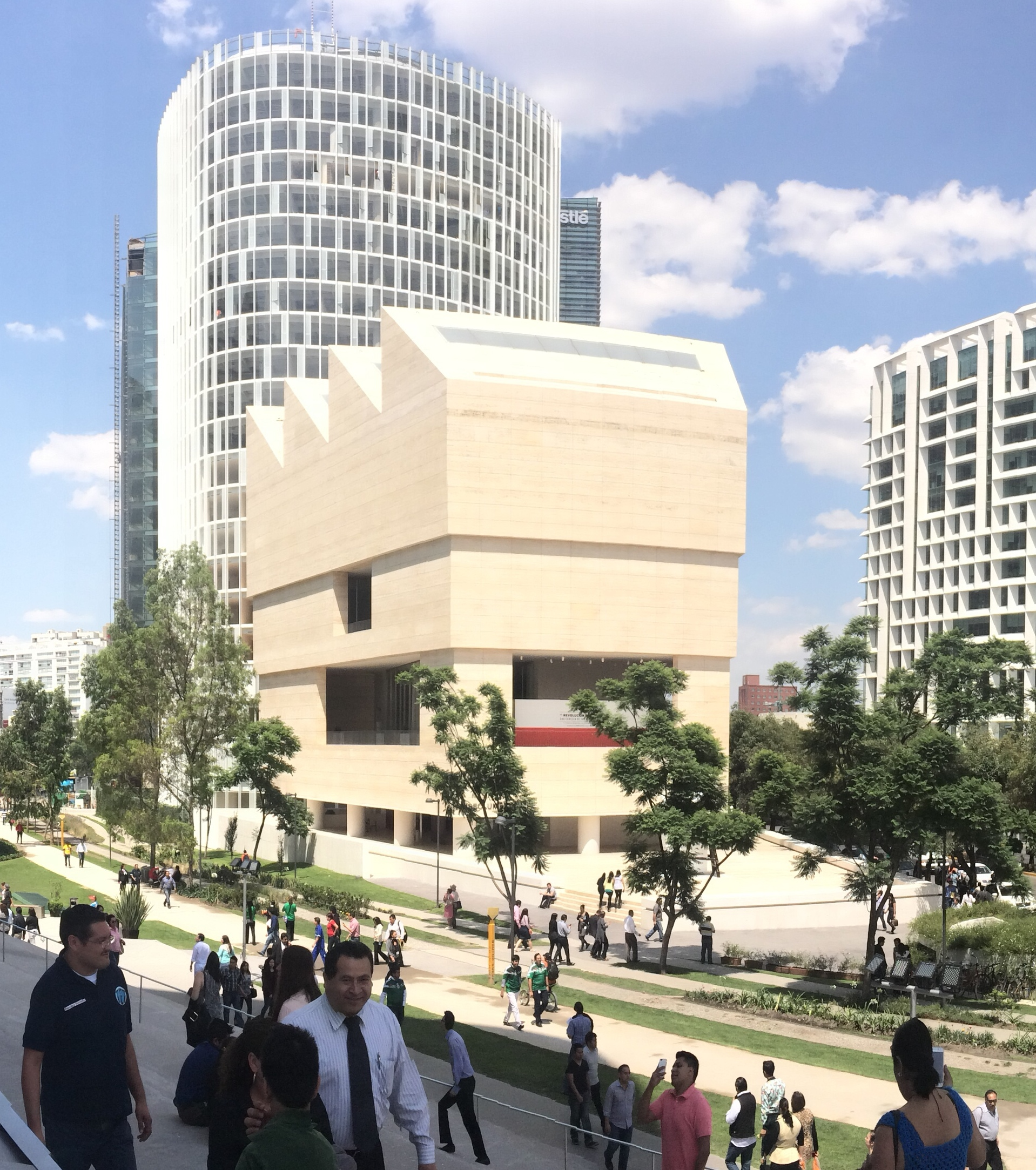
The Museo Júmex's saw-tooth roof allows for indirect natural lighting and alludes to the area's industrial past.

The area has now largely been converted into new shopping and mixed-use developments. These include:

- Acuario Inbursa, Mexico's largest aquarium, opened in June 2014
- Antara Polanco a fashionable shopping and restaurants center, built on the land previously occupied by a General Motors de Mexico car assembly plant
- Plaza Carso, a large cultural, commercial, office and living complex owned by Carlos Slim, built on the land formerly occupied by General Popo-General Tire battery and tire plant. The total cost of the complex is quoted between US$800 million and 1.4 billion. The complex claims to be the largest mixed-use development in Latin America and includes the following components:
  - Museo Soumaya, owned by the Carlos Slim Foundation. The museum contains the Slim's extensive art, religious relic, historical document, and coin collection. The museum holds works by many of the best known European artists from the 15th to the 20th century including a large collection of casts of sculptures by Auguste Rodin. The building is a shiny silver cloud-like structure reminiscent of a Rodin sculpture.
  - Museo Júmex, opening November 2013, to house part of the Colección Jumex, the contemporary art collection of the Jumex juice company.
  - Plaza Carso shopping center, featuring an 82,500 square feet (7,660 m^{2}) Saks Fifth Avenue store, the second to have opened in Mexico. Together with the atrium this section measures 48,090 square metres (517,600 ft^{2}).
  - Teatro Cervantes theater, seating 1500
  - Residential towers: Torre Dalí, Torre Monet and Torre Rodin
  - Office towers, two of 23 floors each, and one of 20 floors. The three buildings are joined on the lower 3 levels by an atrium and the shopping center. The towers are: Torre Telcel - the headquarters of América Móvil are here; Torre Falcon, and Torre Zurich.
- Miyana, one of the largest mixed-use developments in the city, consisting of apartment buildings, a VIP Cinepolis, several stores and tens of restaurants and eating places.
- Grand Polanco, developed on the land previously occupied by a Chrysler franchise
- Parques Polanco, first occupied by Fábricas Automex, a Chrysler car assembly plant
- Portika Polanco
- Ventanas Polanco
- Terret Polanco (office complex, under construction), located in land previously used by a factory producing yeast
- Polarea, located on the grounds until recently occupied the plant of Vitro, a glass factory.
- Alto Polanco (apartments, under construction), on the grounds previously housing the H. Steele y Compañía office furniture factory (formerly the Cia. Hulera Euzkadi tire plant)

The new headquarters of the Embassy of the United States, Mexico City will be located in New Polanco, a large complex to be built on land previously used for a Colgate-Palmolive plant.

Since around 2020 the array has become the center of a new group of temporary residents and immigrants from China, working for the Mexican subsidiaries of Chinese companies, with local restaurants and other businesses opening to serve them.
