= San Joaquín metro station (Mexico City) =

Mexico City metro station

San Joaquín
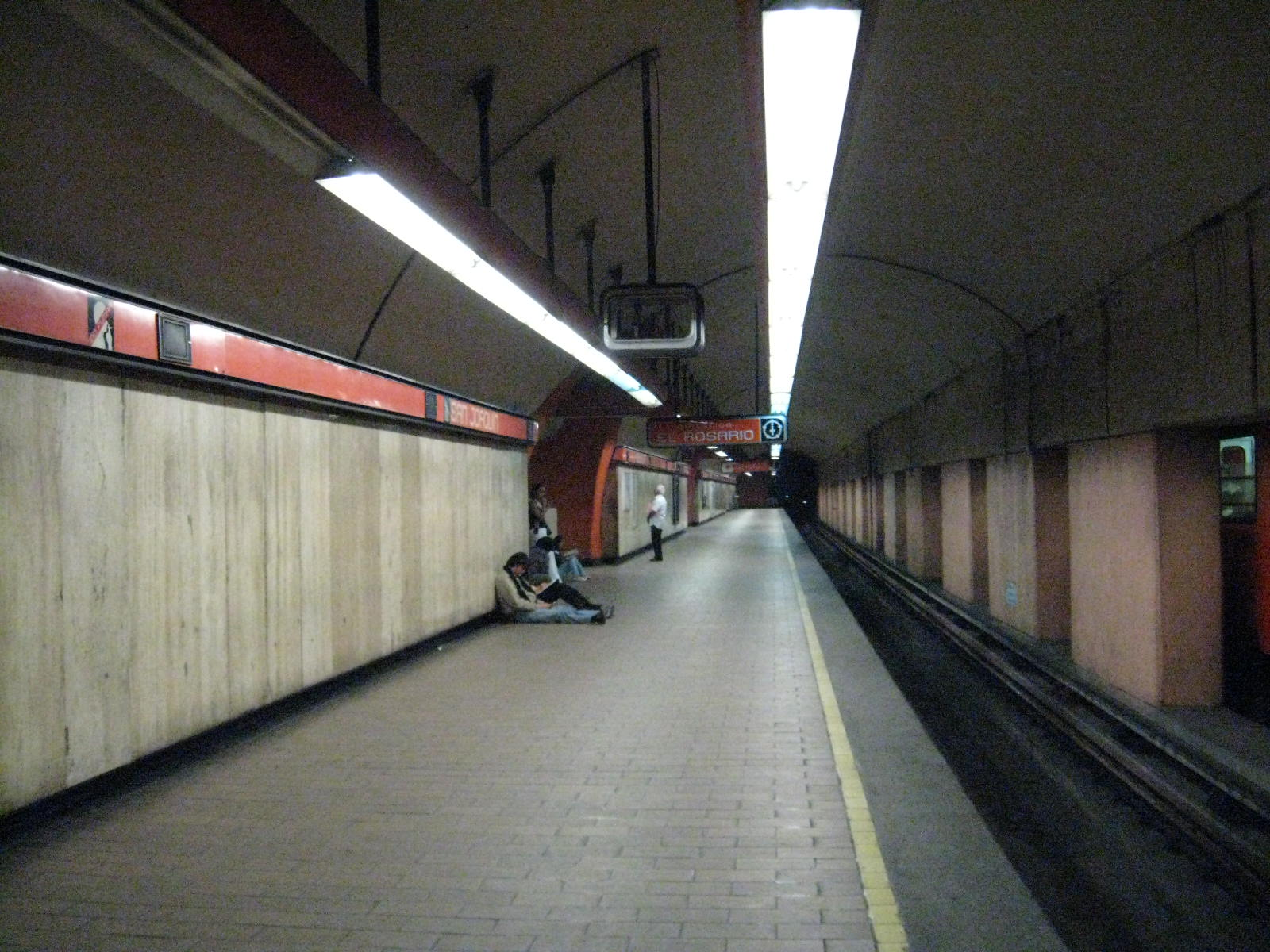
- Northbound platform

General information
- Location: Lago Hielmar street Cuauhtémoc Pensil, Miguel Hidalgo; Mexico City; Mexico
- Coordinates: 19°26′45″N 99°11′31″W
- System: Mexico City Metro
- Operator: Sistema de Transporte Colectivo (STC)
- Platforms: 2 side platforms
- Tracks: 2

Construction
- Structure type: Underground
- Platform levels: 1
- Parking: No
- Cycle facilities: Yes
- Accessible: Yes

Other information
- Status: In service

History
- Opened: 20 December 1984; 41 years ago

Passengers
- 2025: 8,281,027 (Note: The data here is limited to the most recent ten years to avoid excessive listings; earlier figures can be found in this page's history or on the Mexico City Metro website. To calculate the average daily ridership, the annual total is divided by 365 days (366 in leap years), with decimals omitted from the result. Each station per line is ranked individually, as the system counts transfer stations separately. The percentage change is calculated automatically using the data from the current year and the previous year.) ▲9.28%
- Rank: 45/195

Services
Preceding station	Mexico City Metro	Following station
Tacuba toward El Rosario	Line 7	Polanco toward Barranca del Muerto
Route map
Location
- Location within Mexico City
- Area map

San Joaquín (Spanish: Estación San Joaquín) is a station along Line 7 of the metro of Mexico City.

Its logo represents the silhouette of one of the bridges of the radial Viaducto Río San Joaquín.

It was opened on 20 December 1984.

It is located in the Colonia Pensil Sur neighborhood and nearby points of interest include the Panteón Francés de San Joaquín.

== Ridership ==
Annual passenger ridership
Year	Ridership	Average daily	Rank	% change	Ref.
2025	8,281,027	22,687	45/195	+9.28%
2024	7,577,938	20,704	47/195	+7.03%
2023	7,080,351	19,398	54/195	+22.24%
2022	5,792,371	15,869	67/195	+18.29%
2021	4,896,923	13,416	52/195	−16.58%
2020	5,870,366	16,039	44/195	−45.42%
2019	10,755,360	29,466	45/195	+9.27%
2018	9,843,032	26,967	52/195	+7.97%
2017	9,116,304	24,976	53/195	−1.51%
2016	9,256,336	25,290	58/195	+10.04%

== Exits ==
- West: Lago Hielmar and Lago Ginebra, Colonia Pencil Sur
- East: Lago Hielmar and Lago Ginebra, Colonia Pencil Sur

== Services and Accessibility ==
The station San Joaquín of Line 7 the Mexico City Metro It has accessibility and services for people with disabilities such as lockers, turnstiles and information screens.

== Gallery ==
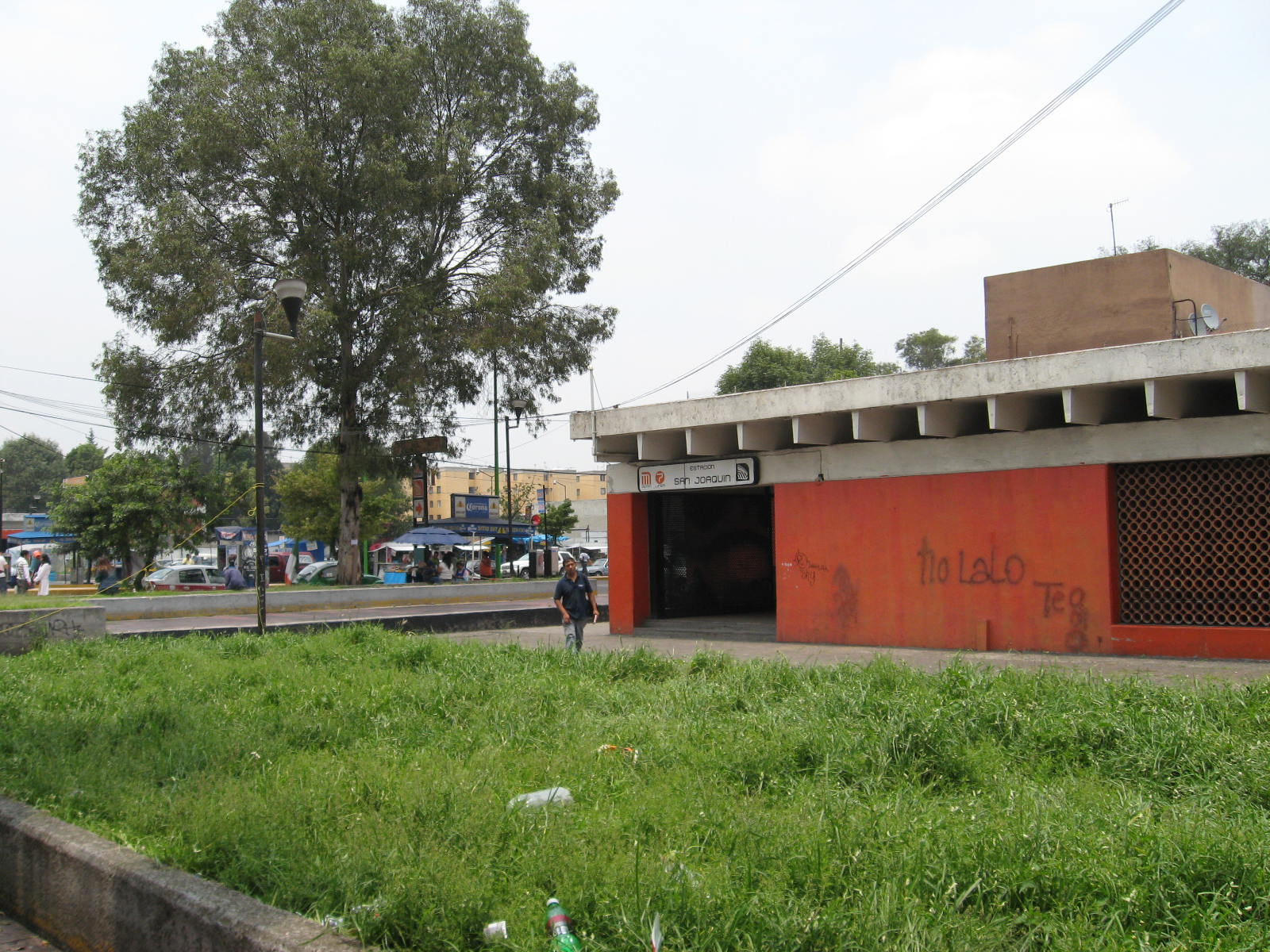
Lago de Terminos Street entrance to Metro station San Joaquín

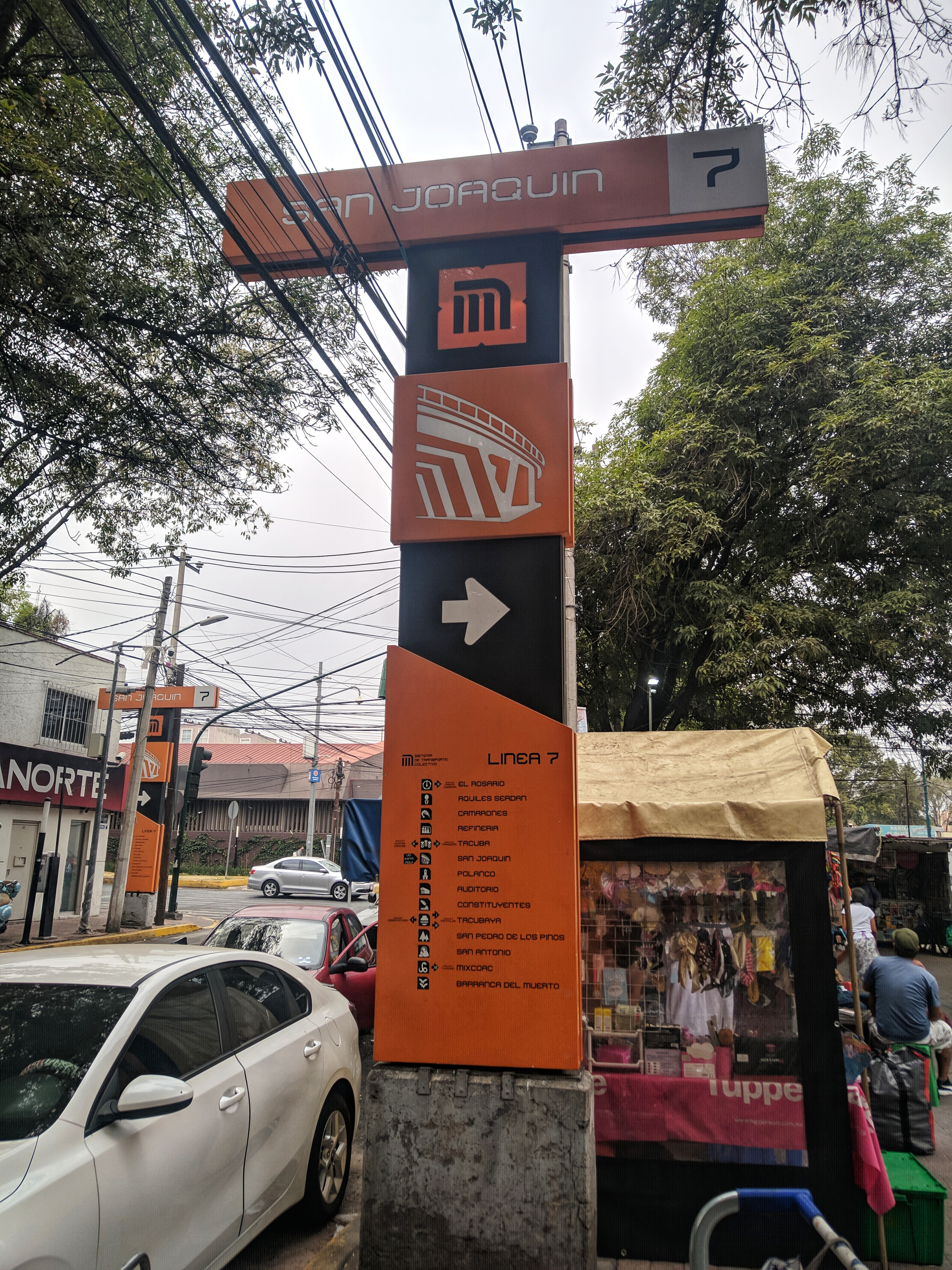
Station sign
