= Miguel Hidalgo, Mexico City =

Coordinates: 19°24′24″N 99°11′28″W

Miguel Hidalgo
- Borough
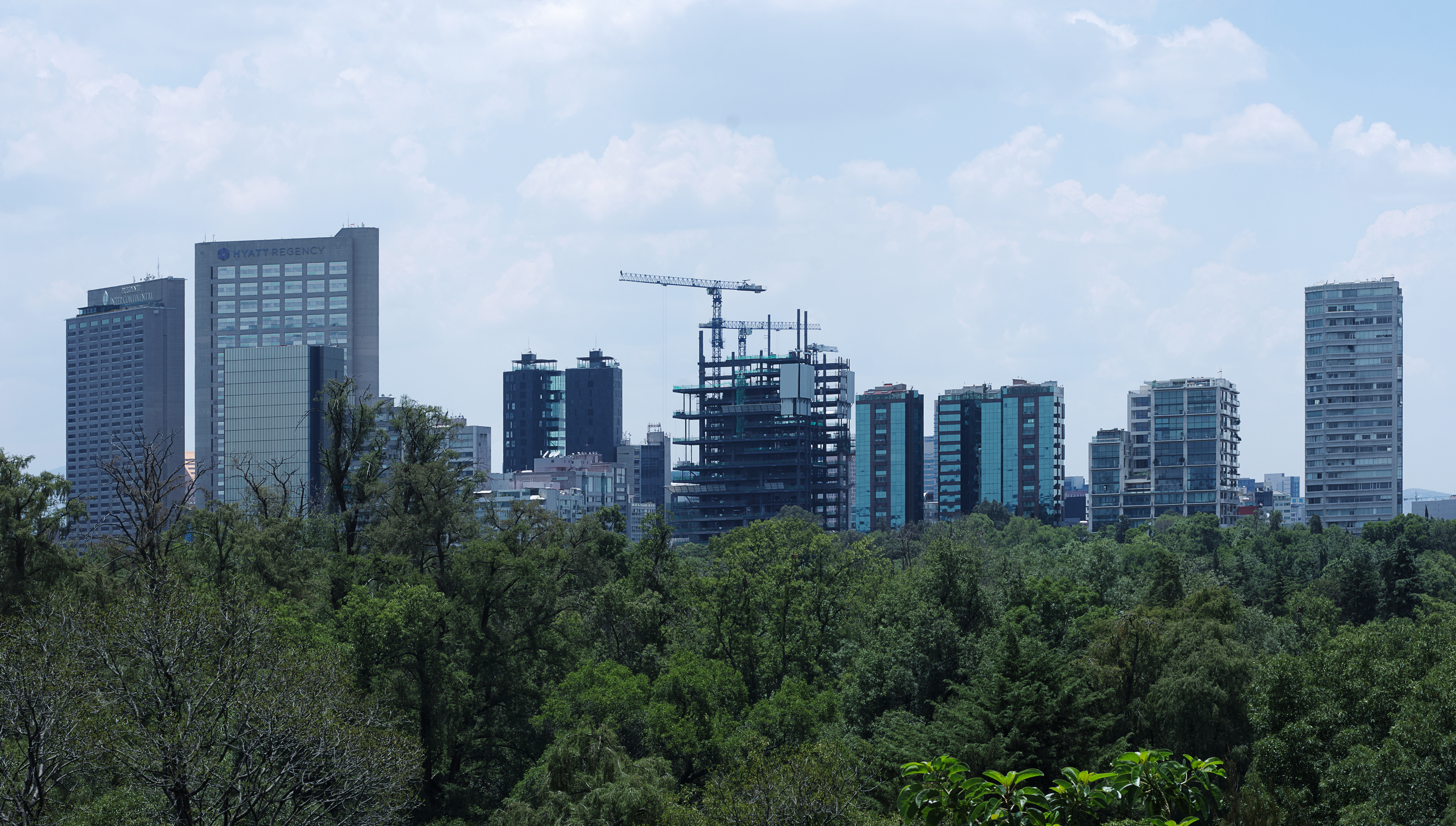
- Polanco district in Miguel Hidalgo

- Seal

- Location of Miguel Hidalgo in Mexico City
- Country: Mexico
- Federal entity: Mexico City

Government
  - Federal electoral district: CDMX-10

Area
  - Total: 26.96 sq mi (69.8 km^{2})

Population (2020)
  - Total: 414,470
  - Density: 15,370/sq mi (5,936/km^{2})
- Time zone: UTC-6 (Zona Centro)
- Website: miguelhidalgo.cdmx.gob.mx

Miguel Hidalgo is a borough (alcaldía) in western Mexico City, it encompasses the historic areas of Tacuba, Chapultepec and Tacubaya along with a number of notable neighborhoods such as Polanco and Lomas de Chapultepec. With landmarks such as Chapultepec Park and the Museo Nacional de Antropología, it is the second most visited borough in Mexico City after Cuauhtémoc where the historic center of Mexico City is located. Tacubaya and Tacuba both have long histories as independent settlements and were designated as "Barrios Mágicos" by the city for tourism purposes.

== Geography ==
The borough is located in the northwest of Mexico City, just west of the historic center. The borough is divided into eighty one neighborhoods called colonias. The largest of these is Bosques de las Lomas at 3.2 km^{2}, and the smallest is Popo Ampliación with only 0.33 km^{2}. It is bordered by the boroughs of Azcapotzalco, Cuauhtémoc, Benito Juárez, Álvaro Obregón and Cuajimalpa, and the State of Mexico to the west. It has a territory of 47.68 km^{2} which is 3.17 percent of the total Mexico City.

The borough consists of an area which used to the west bank of Lake Texcoco, with three major zones, Tacuba, Chapultepec and Tacubaya. The geography of the borough includes canyons, hills and mesas associated with the Sierra de las Cruces, most present in the southwest bordering Cuajimalpa. In the northeast, mostly defined by the Interior Circuit ringway. The most important elevation is the Cerro de Chapultepec at 2,260masl. The area today is almost completely developed with green spaces mostly limited to parks. The largest green space is Chapultepec Park at 2.2 km^{2}. Parque Lineal was the former rail line of the Ferrocarril de Cuernavaca. The strip was converted into a park in 2011. Where the park crosses Lago Constanza Street in Colonia Anáhuac, there are often cultural events held. One of the newest parks in the borough is located on Lago Caneguin in Colonia Argentina, created over a former roadway called Ruta 100. The unnamed park has 10,000 meters of surface area, kiosk, gymnasium, bicycle path, multipurpose room, parking, rain water containment system and child care center. It serves about 40,000 area residents. In 2008, reforestation efforts were undertaken, beginning at the Cañitas Park. While there were important rivers here such as Remedios, today there are no longer any free flowing currents of water. The climate is semi moist and temperate with annual rainfall varying between 700 and 800mm. The average annual temperature is 15C with lows in the winter about 8C and highs around 19C.

Certain areas of the borough have problems with the stability of the ground due to old abandoned underground mines. These areas include the América, Daniel Garza, 16 de Septiembre, Daniel Garza Apliación and Observatorio neighborhoods, which are particularly affected, but the problem also is found in El Capulín, Monte Sol and Ex Hacienda de Pedregal. The number of people living in these areas is estimated at over 25,000, and about 500 families living in very high risk areas. Abandoned mines have also been detected in Tacubaya, Lomas Altas, Bosque de las Lomas and even under Chapultepec Park.

== Demographics and socioeconomics ==
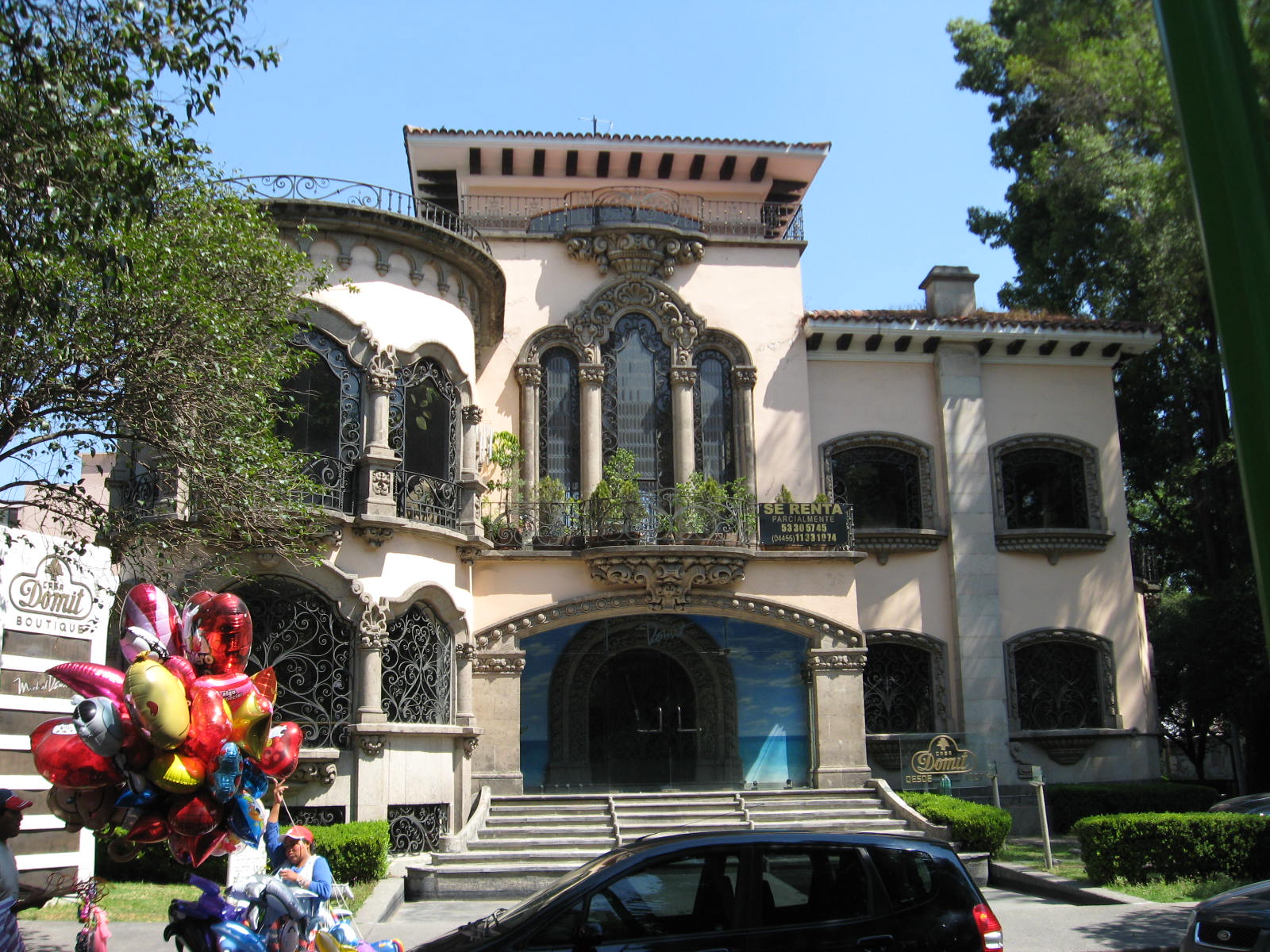
Early 20th-century house in Polanco

As of 2005, the borough had 106,005 residences of which 25,308 were freestanding houses, 54,079 were apartments and the rests of other types. This total number grew to a total of 123,910. About eighty percent of homes are owned by their residents and not rented. Around 95% have basic services such as electricity and running water. While the borough contains mostly working class areas in and around Tacuba and Tacubaya, the southwest contains some of the most exclusive colonias of the borough. While most of the borough is residential, the population of the borough has dropped from 650,497 in 1960 to 372,889 in 2010. It is now the twelfth most densely occupied borough of sixteen. Just over eighty eight percent identify themselves as Catholic.

The borough has 112 preschools, 160 primary schools, 79 middle schools, seven vocational/technical high schools and 49 high schools. The borough has an educational program called "Faros del Saber" (Lighthouses of Knowledge), which began in 2001. There are nine installations related to the program: each dedicated to a different field, such as ecology and science and technology, and each designed to promote these fields to the youth of the borough through workshops and various events. The main library of the program is part of CONACULTA and is designed to promote reading. The borough also offers classes to youth and adults in basic computer technology.

Main thoroughfares include Paseo de la Reforma, Calzada México Tacuba, the Anillo Periférico, Avenida V Palmas and Avenida Constituyentes. Numerous bus and Metro lines pass through here, with the major transportation hub centered in Metro Tacubaya, where Lines 1, 7 and 9 converge. The borough is also home to the Observatorio bus station, which mostly serves buses heading west to Toluca and other destinations.

The working population is 45.4% of the total. Overall socioeconomic marginalization of the borough is ranked very low. The borough is the second most visited by tourists in Mexico City according to the Secretary of Tourism of the Federal District, receiving just under 13% of total visitors in 2006. The borough has nineteen major hotels, and five of the six best hotels in the city. Its major, upscale restaurants and entertainment centers are located in Polanco and Lomas de Chapultepec. Five star hotels include the Presidente Intercontinental, the Marriott and Niko, all located on Paseo de la Reforma next to Chapultepec Park. Commercial centers include eighteen traditional markets, the upscale shopping corridor along Avenida Presidente Masarik in Polanco and various malls.

Bases for unlicensed taxis and areas crowded with unregulated street vendors is a major problem, especially around Christmas time. Most street-vending occurs in the Tacuba, Tacubaya, Chapultepec, Argentinas, Lomas and Polanco neighborhoods. A number of stationary public markets have problems with abandoned stalls. This is occurs in the Tacuba, Anáhuac Anexo, Anáhuac Zone and El Chorrito markets. The main reason that these markets struggle is competition from supermarkets, but the deterioration of the buildings is another factor.

== History ==
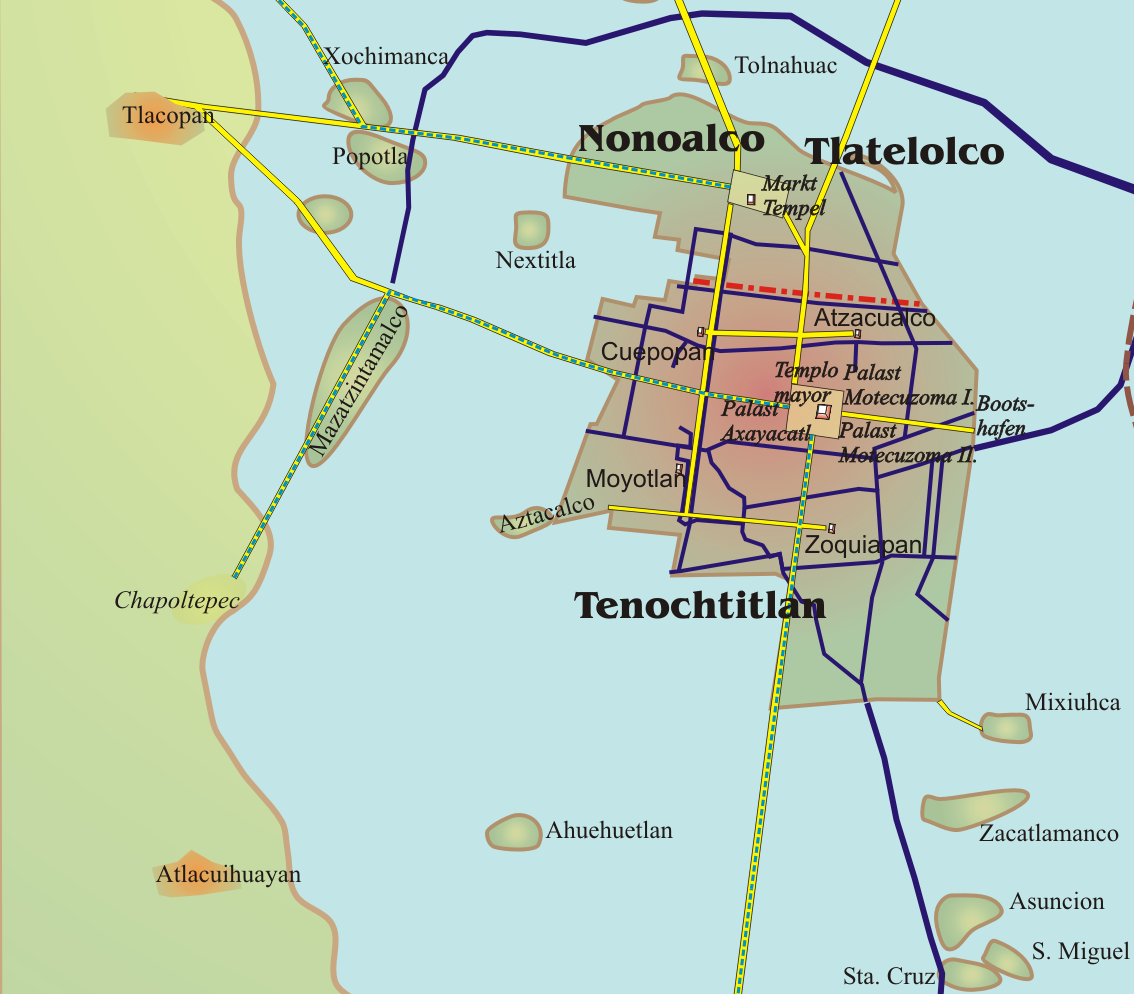
Map of Lake Texcoco with Tenochtitlan and the three main settlements of Miguel Hidalgo, Tacuba, Chapultepec and Atlacuihuayan (Tacubaya) on the west bank

The borough is named after Miguel Hidalgo y Costilla, who began the Mexican War of Independence . The borough was created by fusing various former municipalities such as Tacuba, Tacubaya and the Chapultepec Park area along with the neighborhoods such as Polanco, Lomas de Chapultepec, Bosques de las Lomas, Popotla, Las Pensil, La Argentina, America, Santa Julia and Observatorio. The center of the borough is considered to be Chapultepec Park.

Until the 20th century, Tacuba, Chapultepec and Tacubaya had separate histories, all part of the Federal District of Mexico City during most of this entity's existence under various arrangements. In 1899, the Federal District was divided into the municipality of Mexico and six prefectures, one of which was Tacubaya. This arrangement was reconfirmed in 1917. In 1928, the Federal District was reorganized as a department under the direct control of the federal government. The territory was reorganized into Mexico City proper and thirteen boroughs: Guadalupe-Hidalgo, Azcapotzalco, Iztacalco, General Anaya, Coyoacán, San Ángel, La Magdalena Contreras, Cuajimalpa, Tlalpan, Iztapalapa, Xochimilco, Milpa Alta and Tláhuac. The city proper was divided into twelve districts. What is now Miguel Hidalgo, was part of Mexico City proper. In 1970, the city area was subdivided into four parts, Cuauhtémoc, Venustiano Carranza, Benito Juárez and Miguel Hidalgo.

Borough map with 1970 divisions

The various political arrangements to the present day have been a result of the growth of Mexico City proper. Tacuba, Chapultepec and Tacubaya in the pre Hispanic period were located on the western shore of Lake Texcoco, just west of the island where the Aztecs established Tenochtitlan. After the Spanish conquest of the Aztec Empire, the Spanish established their capital in Tenochtitlan, renaming it Mexico City. Constant flooding problems, almost forced the Spanish to move the capital to Tacubaya in the early 17th century; however, it was decided to drain and fill in the lake instead. This effort would extend over the colonial period and well after Independence. Drainage of the lake would create land on which Mexico City grew.

At the beginning of the 20th century, the very edge of Mexico City has reached the villages of Tacuba and Tacubaya. During the first third of this century, the country estates, farmland and ranches between Tacuba, Tacubaya and Mexico City proper were turned into subdivisions for housing, with roads and other paved areas taking over empty fields. From the 1930s, population growth and development increased with the establishment of industrial and commercial areas. In the 1940s, the Polanco area between Chapultepec and Santa Julia was developed. Various public and private enterprises were installed along the avenues of Ejército Nacional and Marina Nacional. The Secretary of Defense made its home at Lomas de Sotelo. On the far west of the borough large cemeteries such as Panteón Francés, General Sancturum, Panteón Inglés and Panteón Español were opened. One reason for the westward expansion was that wealthy families were abandoning the historic center of Mexico City for newer areas. This began with areas such as Colonia Roma and Condesa, but later they would move to Polanco. This movement west still continues into the Lomas area.

== Chapultepec ==
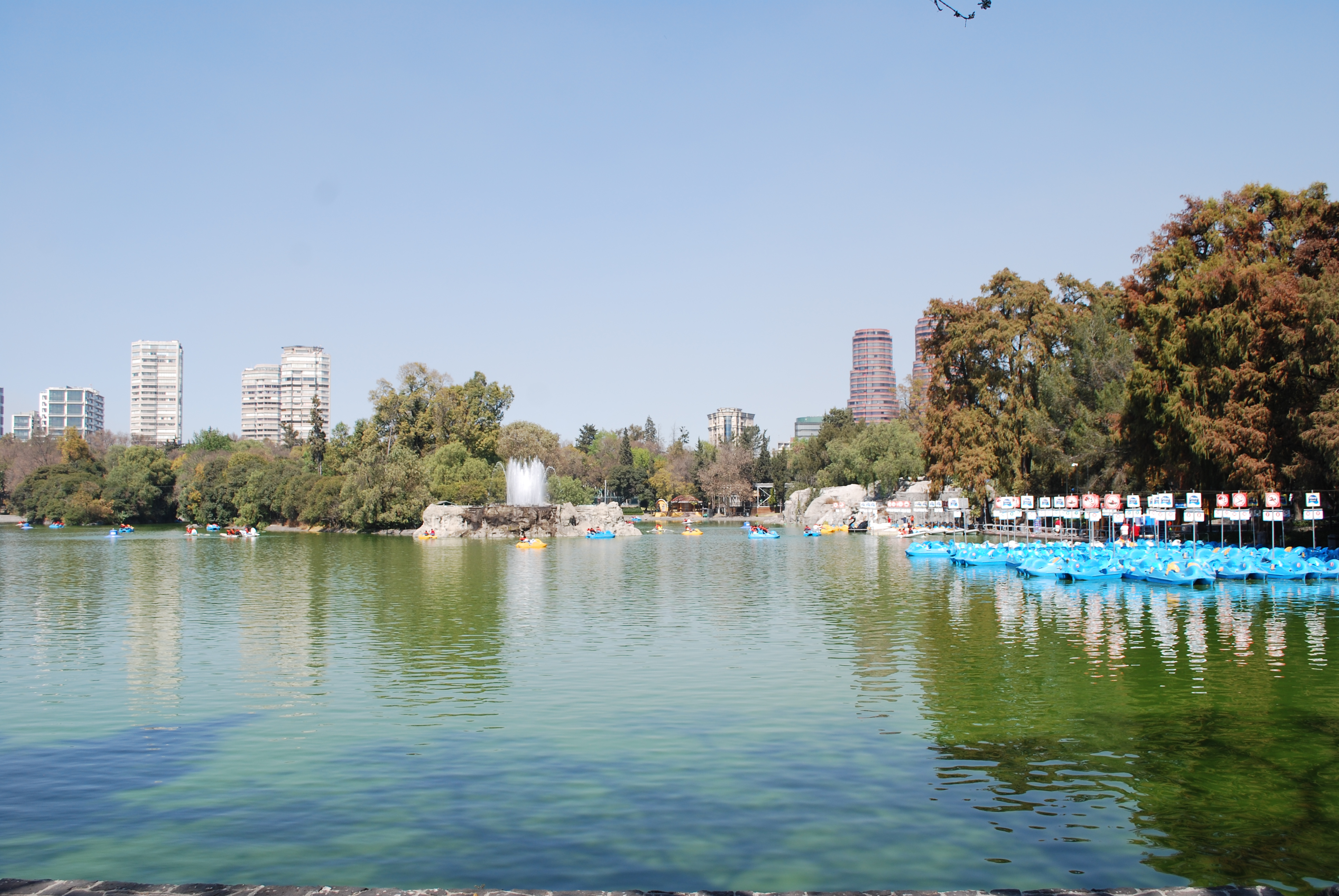
Lake view in the first section of Chapultepec

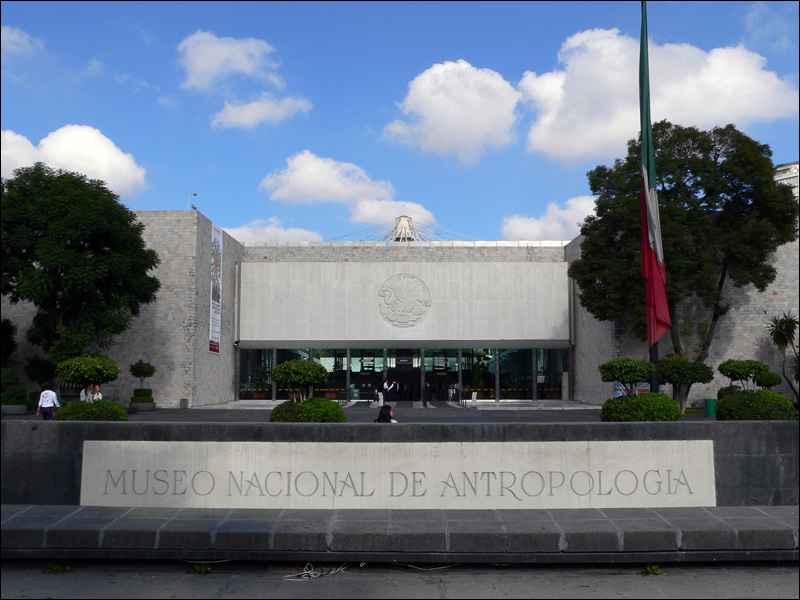
Facade of the National Anthropology Museum

The center of the borough is Chapultepec Park. Chapultepec Park, more commonly called the "Bosque de Chapultepec" (Chapultepec Forest) in Mexico, is the largest city park in Latin America, measuring in total just over 686 hectares.

The area has been considered special since long in the pre Hispanic period when it was a ceremonial site and later a retreat for Aztec emperors. There is also evidence of settlements here by the Chichimecas and Toltecs. The Mexicas lived here at before they were expelled by Azcapotzalco. After finally establishing Tenochtitlan, the Mexicas or Aztecs considered Chapultepec sacred. The first aqueduct from there to Tenochtitlan/Mexico City was built by Moctezuma Ilhuicamina. Later Moctezuma Xocoyotzin had fish tanks and gardens constructed on the site. And Nezahualcoyotl had a palace constructed at the base of the hill. After the Conquest, Hernán Cortés tried to take this land for himself but Charles V denied this and made the area the heritage of Mexico City because it contained many of the springs that provided the city with potable water. The second and third sections of Chapultepec were opened in 1962 and 1974 respectively, with the third section from part of the lands which were an old paper factory.

The two most important museums are the Museo Nacional de Antropología and the Chapultepec Castle National History Museum. These and most of the rest of the museums in the first section are located along Paseo de la Reforma. Of all of the museums in the park, the most famous is the Museo Nacional de Antropología, considered to be one of the greatest archeological museums in the world. The museum has a number of antecedents beginning from the colonial period, but the current institution was created in the 1960s with the building and grounds designed by architect Pedro Ramírez Vázquez. This museum has an area of 44,000m2 and 25 exhibit halls with sections devoted to each of the major pre-Hispanic civilizations in Mexico including the Aztec, Maya, Toltec and Olmec. The permanent collection is so large, that it is possible to spend an entire day to see it. There are also temporary exhibits as well.

The Castle of Chapultepec is on Chapultepec Hill on which the park is historically centered. Construction of this castle was begun in the 1780s and includes towers and merlons, not for defense, but to give the structure a more royal feel. In 1847, the Castle was the scene of the Battle of Chapultepec and the suicide of the "Niños Héroes" or Boy Heroes. A monument to these boys is located at the foot of Chapultepec Hill. From the 19th in to the 20th centuries, this structure was used as the official residence of Mexico's heads of state until this was changed to Los Pinos in the 1930s. Residents included Maximiliano I of Mexico, who had Paseo de la Reforma, which passes through Chapultepec Park, built to connect the area with the center of the city. Today, it is home to the National History Museum.

Other features of the park include the Chapultepec Zoo, two artificial lakes with a lake house (Casa del Lago) and various pre Hispanic ruins including the remains of the Baths of Moctezuma, which was used until the 19th century when the area's springs dried up.

== Neighborhoods ==
Neighborhoods (colonias) in the borough include Bosques de las Lomas, Lomas de Chapultepec, Granada, Ampl. Granada, Pensil, Polanco, San Miguel Chapultepec, and the two formerly independent municipalities of Tacuba and Tacubaya.

=== Tacuba ===
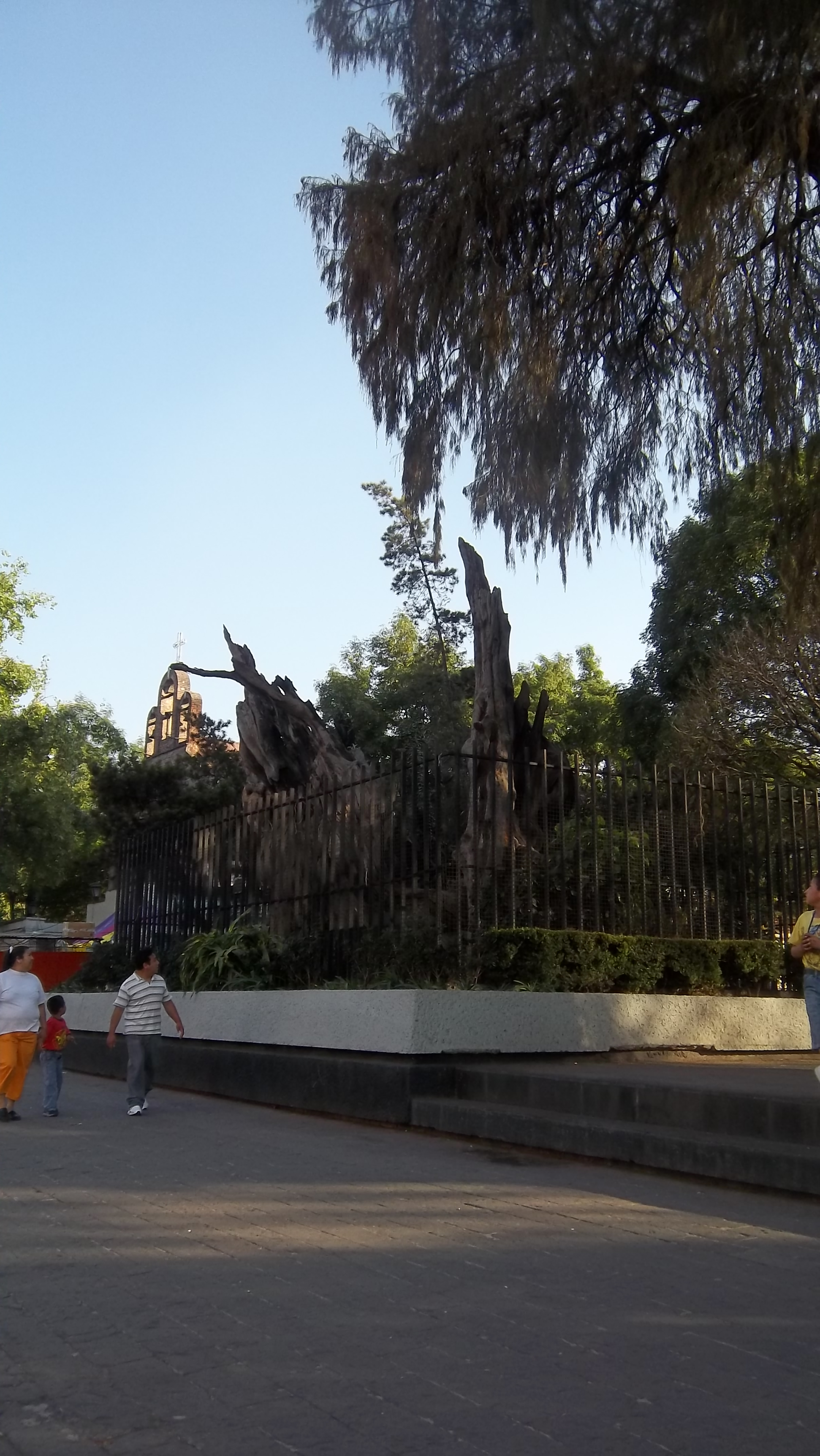
Remnants of the "Tree of the Sad Night" in the Popotla neighborhood, historically part of Tacuba

Tacuba was called Tlacopan in the pre Hispanic period. Tacuba is derived from the former Nahuatl name "Tlacopan" and means place of the jarilla plant. It was conquered by Azcapotzalco which placed Totoquihuatzin as governor. When the Tenochtitlan and Texcoco decided to ally against Azcapotzalco, Tlacopan did not resist and for this reason is considered to be the third of the Aztec Triple Alliance. Tacuba's importance led to the construction of a causeway over the lake linking it with Tenochtitlan. Today, this causeway still exists as a major thoroughfare called Calzada Mexico-Tacuba.

During the Spanish conquest of the Aztec Empire, the Aztecs succeeded at one point in expelling the Spanish from Tenochtitlan in an event called La Noche Triste (The Sad Night). Cortés and his men fled towards Tacuba on the road that still connects it with the historic center of Mexico City. One year later, Cortés returned to Tenochtitlan to conquer it for good. At the intersection of the Mexico-Tacuba Road and Mar Blanco is a still surviving Montezuma cypress tree. According to legend, this is the tree under which Cortés wept.

The last ruler of Tacuba was Tetlepanquetzal, who was tortured by Cortés, who suspected that he was hiding treasure. Over the pre Hispanic ceremonial site, the Franciscans constructed a church dedicate to the Archangel Gabriel. By 1632, the area had sixty haciendas and by the end of the 18th century, 28 villages with Tacuba proper having twelve neighborhoods. The main river through here was the Remedios, which was the main supply of water. In addition, to agriculture, the area was also an important supplier of lumber and sandstone for construction. By 1794, the area had 45 villages.

In the first third of the 20th century, three important schools were established in Tacuba. The Colegio Militar was moved to Popotla in 1913, closed during the Mexican Revolution and reopened in 1920. The Escuela Nacional de Maestros (National Teachers College) was opened in 1925 along with the Escuela de Medicina Veterinaria de UNAM. In 1937, the Instituto Politécnico Nacional was opened in Casco de Santo Tomás.

Since the mid 20th century, Tacuba proper has declined with problems such as crime and sanitation issues. Tacuba has major problems with uncontrolled street vending and public transportation, prostitution and other crime. Rehabilitation of Tacuba is under a program designated RENACE (rebirth).

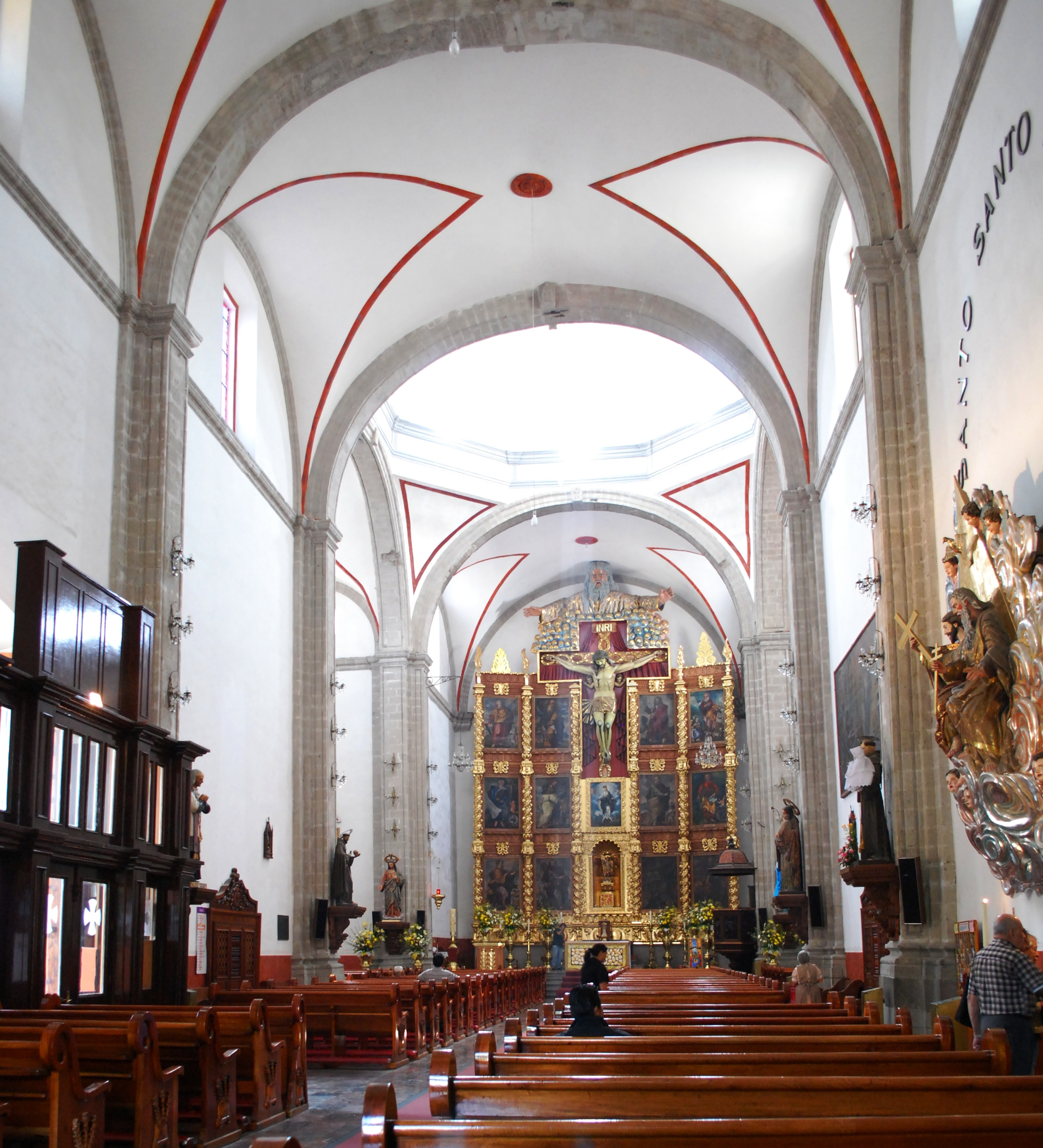
Nave of the San Gabriel Parish

The church and former monastery of San Gabriel is located next to the Tacuba Metro station. The main entrance to the atrium has a stone gate with three arches. The small atrium is mostly paved with a few trees. The façade is mostly Baroque with the portal marked the two grooved Doric columns and topped by a frieze with vegetative design done in relief. It has one bell tower with two levels also in Baroque. The side portal faces Calzada Mexico-Tacuba. It also has an arched entryway, but marked with wavy grooved pilasters and topped with a niche. Part of the former cloister is also preserved. The interior is focused on the main altar, which is gilded and has twelve colonial era paintings of the Virgin Mary and various saints along with Salomonic columns. In the center is an image of the crucified Christ and the top has an image of God, the Father. One other feature of the church is an image of the Child Jesus called the "Niño futbolista" (Football playing child), named such because it is dressed in the uniform of Mexico's national team when it plays in the World Cup.

The Monastery of San Joaquín was founded in 1689 by the Carmelites and conserves its original architecture. It was an important school for young priests.

The Tacuba area is home to a neighborhood called Popotla. Here are the remains of a Montezuma cypress, under which it is said that Hernán Cortés sat and wept after being run out of Tenochtitlan during La Noche Triste in 1520. Next to the plaza where this tree is found, there is an old mansion whose east side has a mural called "Noche de la Victoria" (Night of the Victory) done in 2010. Also here is the parish called Pronto Socorro. Further east along the Calzada Tacuba-Mexico, there is the Colegio Militar, next to the Metro stop of the same name. This school was founded in 1823 and operated until 1976. Today it is the site of the Universidad del Ejército y Fuerza Aérea which still trains part of Mexico's military.

=== Tacubaya ===
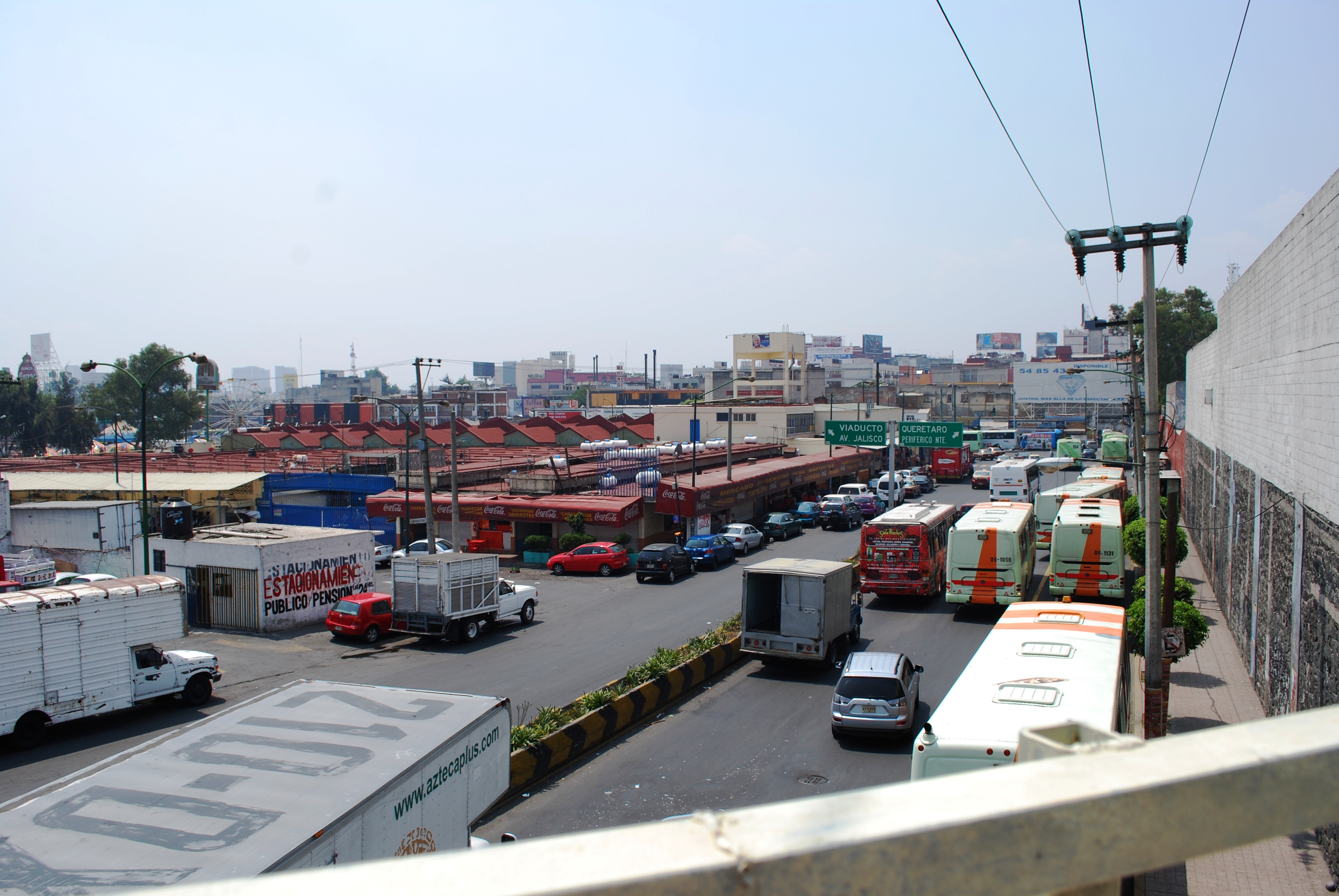
Overlooking market from Avendia Observatorio, present day

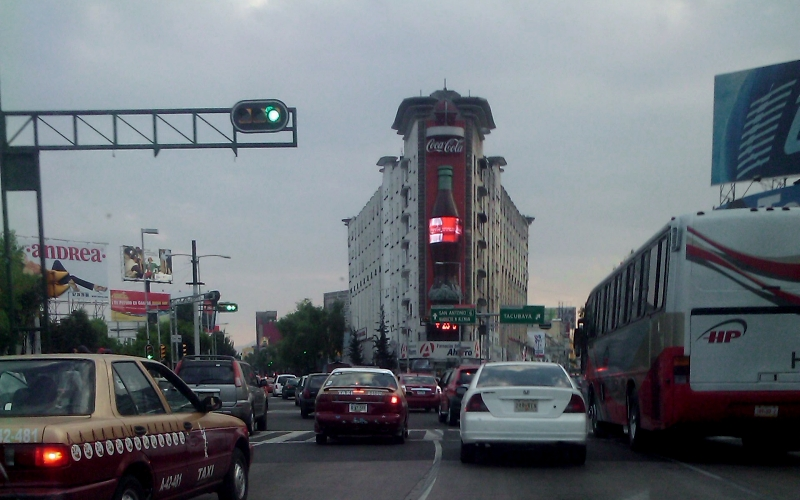
Edificio Ermita

In the Aztec period, Tacubaya was called Atlacuihuayan, "place where the river twists" in Nahuatl and only a way station for travelers. In 1590 after the Spanish conquest, The Dominicans founded a monastery and church called San José de Tacubaya. The area remained rural with orchards, important grain mills and abundant water from its three main rivers of Piedad, Morales and Xola, attracting the wealthy to build country homes here. Some development began in the mid 19th century, and mansion building reached its height here in the late 19th and early 20th century. In the 19th century, the municipality of Tacubaya consisted of Tacubaya proper and the villages of La Piedad, Mixcoac, Santa Fe and Santa Lucía, along with a number of haciendas and ranches. In 1888, Tacubaya had just over 9,000 inhabitants and at the beginning of the 20th, it had 20,000. By the 20th century the urban sprawl of Mexico City reached Tacubaya and its rural nature ended. Its rivers were encased and its springs dried up.

The historic center of Tacubaya still has some of its country mansions from the 19th and early 20th centuries and earlier, such as the Casa de la Bola (House of the Ball) which belonged to the Count De la Cortina until 1783. Only the cloister of the original former monastery of Santo Domingo still exists, and its church is dedicated to Our Lady of the Purification whose main feast day is Candelaria (Candlemas), giving it the alternate name of the Parish of Candlemas. Outside of the historic center, there are several landmarks. Edificio Ermita is one of the first skyscrapers in Mexico City, constructed in 1930 in Art Deco style by architect Juan Segura. The Luis Barragán House and Studio was the home of one of the country's most renowned architects, built in the early 20th century.

Much of Tacubaya is now working class. One major transportation problem is the overcrowding of unregulated vendors, especially around the Tacubaya metro station.

== Economy ==
Interjet has its headquarters in Lomas de Chapultepec. Google Mexico also has its headquarters in Lomas.

Wamos Air has its Mexico City office in Polanco.

== Organizations and diplomatic missions ==
Most of the diplomatic missions in Mexico City are located in Miguel Hidalgo, mainly in the Lomas de Chapultepec and Polanco area.

=== Embassies ===
- Algeria
- Angola
- Argentina
- Australia
- Austria
- Belgium
- Belize
- Bolivia
- Brazil
- Bulgaria
- Canada
- Chile
- Cyprus
- Cuba
- Czech Republic
- Denmark
- Dominican Republic
- Ecuador
- Egypt
- El Salvador
- Finland
- France
- Germany
- Greece
- Guatemala
- Haiti
- Hungary
- India
- Indonesia
- Ireland
- Israel
- Italy
- Ivory Coast
- Jamaica
- Japan
- Lebanon
- Malaysia
- Morocco
- Netherlands
- New Zealand
- Nicaragua
- Nigeria
- North Korea
- Norway
- Panama
- Pakistan
- Paraguay
- Peru
- Philippines
- Portugal
- Romania
- Sahrawi Arab Democratic Republic
- Saudi Arabia
- Serbia
- Slovakia
- South Africa
- South Korea
- Spain
- Sweden
- Switzerland
- Thailand
- Turkey
- Ukraine
- Uruguay
- Venezuela

=== Other diplomatic offices ===
- European Commission Delegation
- Special Palestinian Delegation
- Taipei Economic and Cultural Office in Mexico, the de facto mission of the Republic of China on Taiwan.

=== United Nations agencies ===
The International Civil Aviation Organization (ICAO) has its North American, Central American and Caribbean (NACC) Office in Miguel Hidalgo.

== Education ==
Public high schools of the Instituto de Educación Media Superior del Distrito Federal (IEMS) include:

- Escuela Preparatoria Miguel Hidalgo "Carmen Serdán" (Argentina Antigua)

International schools in Miguel Hidalgo include:

- Lycée Franco-Mexicain (Liceo Franco Mexicano) in Polanco
- The Plantel Lomas Kindergarten Prado Norte facility of the Campus Poniente/Campus West (formerly Campus La Herradura) of the Colegio Alemán Alexander von Humboldt is located in Lomas de Chapultepec.
- The Lomas campus of Peterson Schools is in Lomas de Chapultepec
- Two campuses of the Westhill Institute in Lomas
- The Wingate School Virreyes campus in Lomas (opening 2016)

Other private schools:

- Colegio Ciudad de México Plantel Polanco
- The toddler center campus and the preschool campus of the Eton School in Lomas.
- Two campuses of the Escuela Sierra Nevada: one for preschool, one for elementary school
