= El Palacio de Hierro =

Mexican department store chain

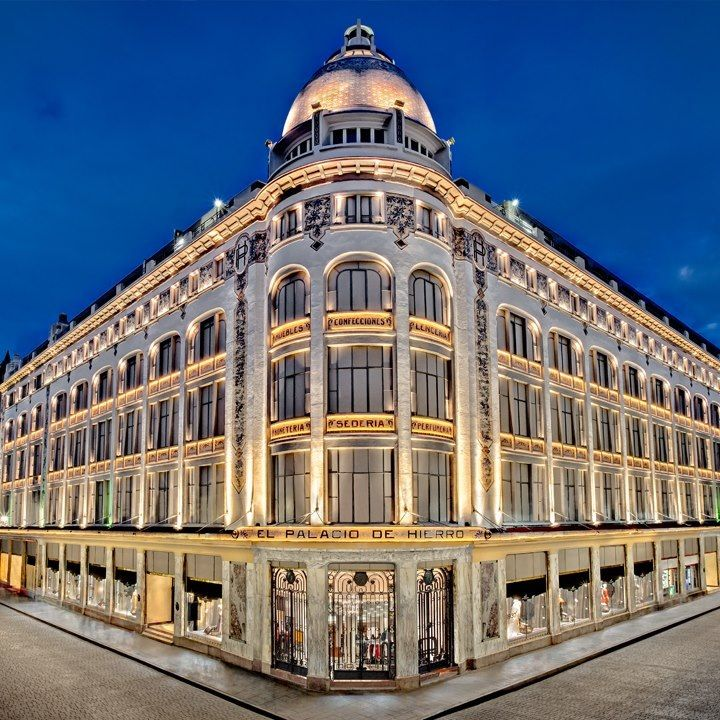
- Original store (1891, rebuilt 1921), still in operation, historic center of Mexico City
- Type: Public (BMV)
- Industry: Retail
- Founded: 1850s as Las Fábricas de Francia; 1891 as El Palacio de Hierro
- Founder: Victor Gassier
- Headquarters: Mexico City, Mexico
- Number of locations: 15 department stores; 2 Casa Palacio; 2 Boutique Palacio; 2 outlets (2025)
- Key people: Alejandro Baillères (controlling shareholder); Eléonore de Boysson (CEO)
- Products: Apparel and accessories, cosmetics, electronics, home furnishings and appliances, gourmet food, services (restaurants, food halls, hair salons, travel agency)
- Revenue: ▲MX$60.7 billion (≈ US$3.1 billion) (2025)
- Parent: Grupo BAL
- Website: www.elpalaciodehierro.com

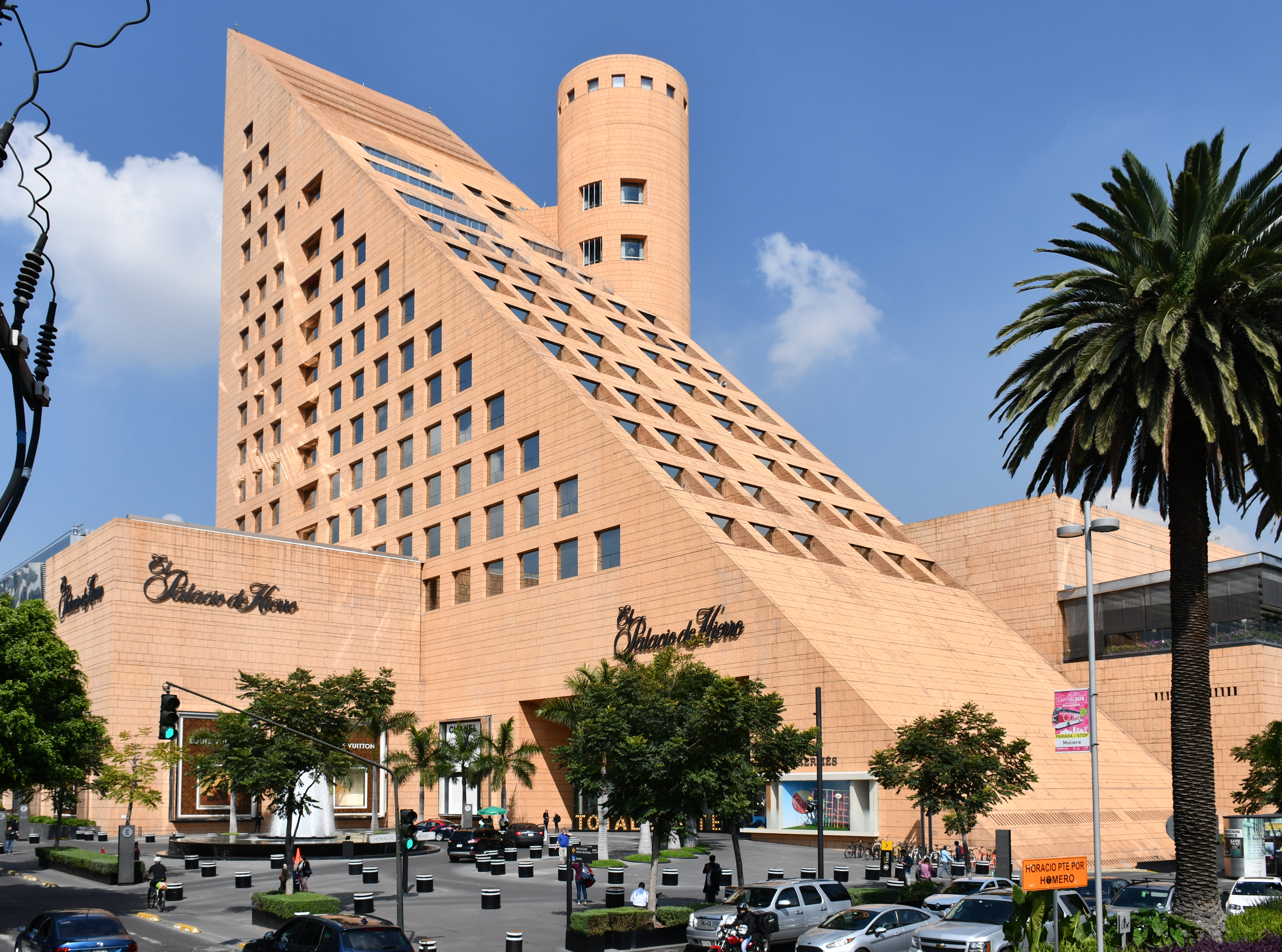
Palacio de Hierro Polanco, Mexico City

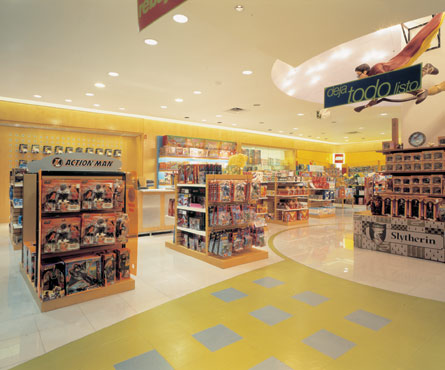
Inside of an El Palacio de Hierro store

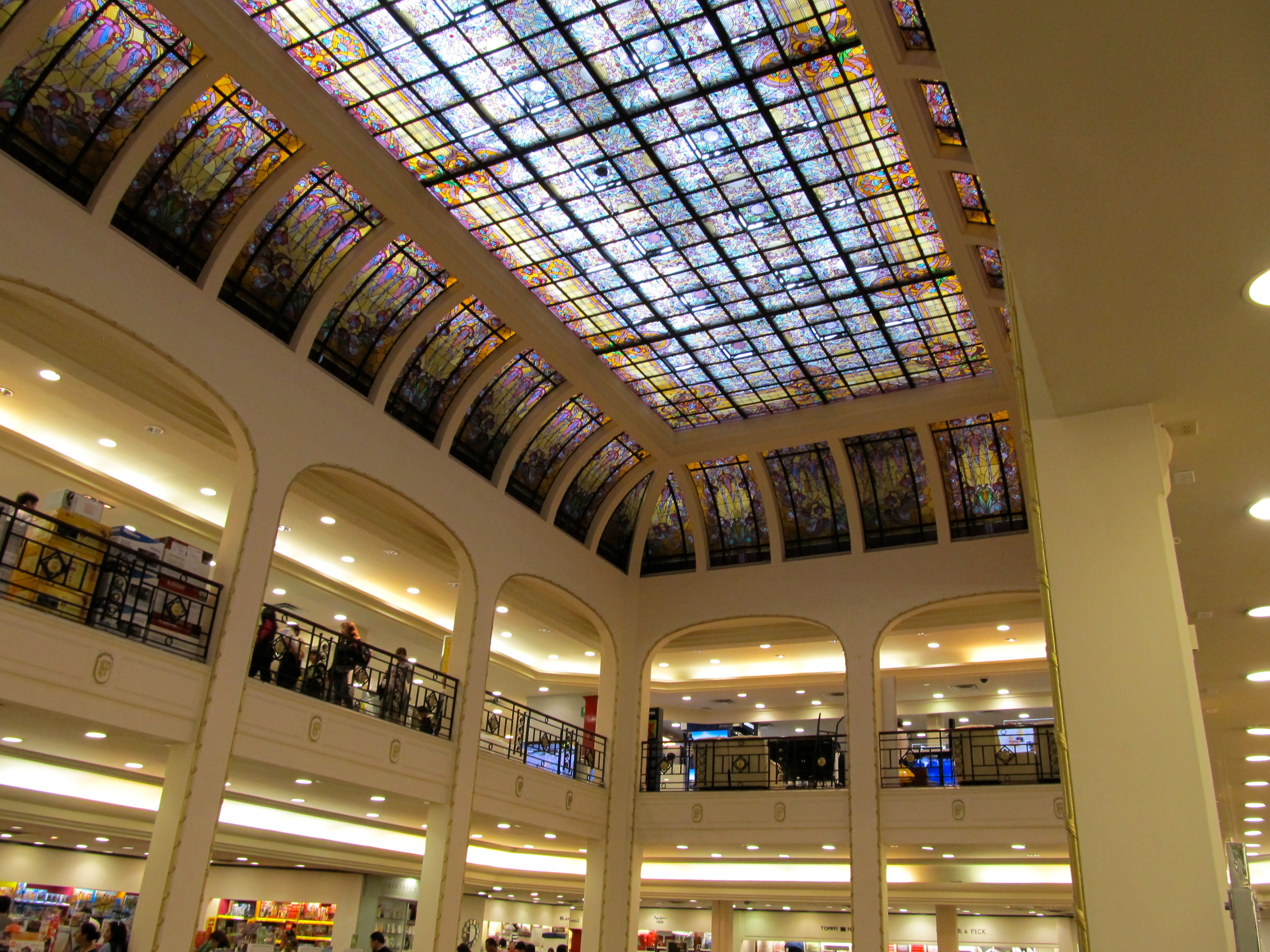
Art Nouveau stained-glass ceiling by Jacques Grüber at the downtown flagship (1921)

El Palacio de Hierro (English: "The Iron Palace") is a Mexican upscale department store chain headquartered in Mexico City. As of 2025 it operated 15 full-line department stores in Greater Mexico City and seven other cities, along with two Casa Palacio home stores, two Boutique Palacio junior department stores and two outlets. The company also runs around 120 freestanding stores for international brands such as Adolfo Domínguez, Aldo, Mango and Michael Kors. It is operated by Grupo Palacio de Hierro, S.A.B. de C.V., part of the Baillères family's Grupo BAL.

The chain has two flagship stores: the original store in the Historic center of Mexico City, and the Palacio de los Palacios ("Palace of Palaces") in Polanco, which reopened in November 2015 after a US$300 million rebuilding. With more than 55,000 m^{2} (592,015 sq ft) of floor space it has been described as the largest department store in Latin America. El Palacio de Hierro has been a member of the International Association of Department Stores since 2000.

== History ==
=== Origins ===
Palacio has its origins as one of the dozens of so-called "Barcelonnettes" department stores founded in the 19th century by immigrants from Barcelonnette and nearby areas, in the French Alps near the Italian border.

In the 1850s, French immigrant Victor Gassier opened a clothing store, Las Fábricas de Francia (The Factories of France), unrelated to the Fábricas de Francia chain that was merged into Liverpool and Suburbia chains. In 1860, Gassier teamed up with Alexander Reynaud, forming a business called Gassier & Reynaud. In 1876, José Tron, his brother Henri and José Leautaud bought in, forming the association V. Gassier & Reynaud, Sucs. S. en C.. In 1879 the business's formal name was changed to J. Tron y Cía. (J. Tron and Co.), but it continued to trade as Las Fábricas de Francia.

As the business grew, Tron and Leautaud planned a store in Mexico City along the lines of the large stores already open in Paris, such as Le Bon Marché. In 1888 they bought the land, and later hired the Mexican architect Ignacio de la Hidalga to build a five-story building, the first in Mexico City made of iron and steel. Passers-by would ask "what iron palace (palacio de hierro) are they building?". When construction finished in 1891, Tron and Leautaud renamed the business El Palacio de Hierro, taking advantage of the publicity earned during construction. The company's deed of incorporation had been signed on 30 January 1888, and the store opened on 1 July 1891. In 1898 the firm was reorganised as El Palacio de Hierro, S.A., reportedly the first Mexican retailer constituted as a sociedad anónima.

On 15 April 1914 a fire destroyed the building, and the business moved to other premises. The Mexican Revolution delayed reconstruction, and the new store, designed by French architect Paul Dubois in Art Nouveau style with dual stained-glass ceilings by Jacques Grüber (1870–1936) of Nancy, France, opened on 14 October 1921.

=== Baillères ownership ===
In October 1963 Raúl Baillères and his son Alberto Baillères each acquired 50% of the shares of El Palacio de Hierro, and Alberto took over as its general director. The chain then began expanding beyond its two stores, downtown and the Durango branch opened in 1958. The company became part of Grupo BAL, the family's conglomerate with interests in insurance, mining and retail. Alberto Baillères led the group until his death on 2 February 2022; it is now controlled by his son Alejandro Baillères.

=== Recent developments ===
In 2015 Juan Carlos Escribano, formerly chief executive of Spain's Grupo Cortefiel (now Tendam), succeeded José María Blanco Alonso as chief executive. Under Escribano the company reopened its Polanco store (2015), opened stores in Veracruz (2019), at Mítikah in Coyoacán (2022) and in León (2024), and renovated its Perisur, Santa Fe and Satélite stores.

In June 2025 Escribano was succeeded by Eléonore de Boysson, a former LVMH executive who had headed DFS Group's operations in Europe and the Middle East and earlier led Louis Vuitton's global store network. She is the first woman to lead the company. In June 2026 the company reopened its Guadalajara store after a two-year, MX$980 million (about US$56 million) rebuilding, and announced a comparable renovation of its Monterrey store. In 2025 the group's revenue rose 8% to MX$60.7 billion (about US$3.1 billion), (Note: Converted at the 2025 average Bank of Mexico FIX exchange rate of about MX$19.3 per US dollar.) with digital sales up 22%.

== Products and brands ==
Product lines are broader than those carried by U.S. department stores today, including full ranges of electronics (televisions, laptops, cellphones), large home appliances (white goods), small appliances, furniture and home furnishings, mattresses, domestics (bed linens, towels), sporting goods, books and magazines, candy, gourmet food, wines and liquors. In-store services include restaurants, food halls, hair salons, spa services and a travel agency. Women's, men's and children's apparel and accessories, fine jewelry, cosmetics and fragrances nonetheless dominate. In these areas Palacio is positioned above other Mexican department store chains such as Liverpool and Sears Mexico.

Palacio carries, and in many cases hosts in-store boutiques for, a broad range of global luxury brands, and is a strategic partner of the major brands of the LVMH, Kering and Richemont groups. It is the exclusive Mexican distributor for brands including Burberry, CH Carolina Herrera, Tiffany, H.Stern, Christian Dior and Loewe. In late 2023, the luxury brands featured on its website included Louis Vuitton, Gucci, Carolina Herrera, Saint Laurent Paris, Alexander McQueen, Dolce & Gabbana, Ferragamo, Givenchy, Chloé, Balmain, Golden Goose Deluxe Brand, Moschino and Rimowa. Other luxury brands carried in recent years have included Bvlgari, Bottega Veneta, Hermès, Cartier, Chanel, Prada, Fendi, Versace, Emilio Pucci, Max Mara, Ermenegildo Zegna, Escada and Ralph Lauren. It also carries Mexican designer labels and premium brands such as Michael Kors, Tommy Hilfiger, Tory Burch, Emporio Armani, Swarovski, and the Spanish labels Adolfo Domínguez, Purificación García^{[es]} and Mango.

== Advertising ==
The chain's best-known slogan, Soy totalmente Palacio ("I am totally Palacio"), came out of a 1995 brand review that Alberto Baillères commissioned from the agency Terán (later Terán\TBWA), which had handled the store's advertising since 1947. The strategy addressed women exclusively; the slogan was introduced in a teaser campaign in 1995 and the full image campaign launched in 1996. The campaign, developed under creative director Ana María Olabuenaga, made Palacio the first Mexican department store group to use outdoor advertising and the first in its segment to advertise in cinemas. It became one of the most awarded campaigns in Mexican advertising; according to the agency, advertising recall rose from 35% to 68% in its first four years. In 2025 it was succeeded by Sí Soy ("Yes, I am"), presented as an evolution of the original slogan.

== Store formats ==
As of 2025, Grupo Palacio de Hierro operated the following formats:

- 15 full-line Palacio de Hierro department stores
- 2 Casa Palacio home stores (Antara and Santa Fe in Mexico City)
- 2 Boutique Palacio junior department stores
- 2 Palacio Outlet stores
- About 120 freestanding brand stores in shopping malls

== Palacio de Hierro stores ==
=== List of department stores ===
Store locations are drawn from the company's store directory and annual report.

El Palacio de Hierro department stores, as of 2026
| Store | State | Municipality / borough | Neighborhood | Setting | Opened | Floor area (m²) | Remarks |
|---|---|---|---|---|---|---|---|
| Centro | Mexico City | Cuauhtémoc | Centro Histórico | Freestanding | 1891 | — | Original store. Destroyed by fire in 1914; rebuilt to a design by Paul Dubois and reopened 14 October 1921. Stained-glass ceilings by Jacques Grüber. |
| Durango | Mexico City | Cuauhtémoc | Roma Norte | Freestanding | 1958 | — | First branch store. Designed by José Aspe Sais and Vladimir Kaspé; remodeled 1967. |
| Perisur | Mexico City | Coyoacán | Jardines del Pedregal de San Ángel | Perisur | 1980 | — | Renovated from 2017. |
| Coyoacán | Mexico City | Benito Juárez | Xoco | Mítikah | 1989 | 38,000 | Opened 1989 in the company's Centro Coyoacán mall; moved to Mítikah in September 2022. Planned expansion to 47,000 m². |
| Santa Fe | Mexico City | Álvaro Obregón | Santa Fe | Centro Santa Fe | 1993 | — | Opened early 1993; renovated from 2017. A Casa Palacio home store is in the same mall, in which the company holds a stake. |
| Polanco | Mexico City | Miguel Hidalgo | Polanco | Freestanding (Moliere 222) | 1997 | 55,248 | De facto flagship, El Palacio de los Palacios. Closed on 7 January 2015 for rebuilding, absorbing the Molière222 mall and roughly tripling its sales floor from about 20,000 m²; reopened in November 2015 after a US$300 million investment. |
| Satélite | State of Mexico | Naucalpan | Ciudad Satélite | Plaza Satélite | 1998 | — | Remodeled November 2023 for about MX$3 billion (about US$170 million). |
| Interlomas | State of Mexico | Huixquilucan | Interlomas | Paseo Interlomas | 2011 | — | Opened November 2011, the first of a three-store expansion followed by Villahermosa and Querétaro. |
| Puebla | Puebla | Puebla | Concepción la Cruz | Angelópolis | 2002 | — | Opened October 2002; the chain's first department store outside Greater Mexico City. The company owns 35% of the mall. |
| Guadalajara | Jalisco | Zapopan | Puerta de Hierro | Andares | 2008 | 33,000 | Opened with the Andares mall in 2008. Rebuilt over 759 days under the Tiendas de Comunidad concept with references to Jalisco culture, and reopened in June 2026 after an investment of MX$980 million (about US$56 million). (Note: Converted at the Bank of Mexico FIX rate of MX$17.51 per US dollar on 30 June 2026.) |
| Monterrey | Nuevo León | San Pedro Garza García | Del Valle | Paseo San Pedro | 2005 | — | Opened November 2005 as anchor of the Paseo San Pedro mall. A renovation on the scale of Guadalajara's was announced in 2026. |
| Querétaro | Querétaro | Querétaro | Jurica | Antea Lifestyle Center | 2014 | — | Opened October 2014 at a cost of MX$1.102 billion (about US$82 million). (Note: Converted at the Bank of Mexico FIX rate of MX$13.40 per US dollar on 2 October 2014.) Facade by Sordo Madaleno Arquitectos; interiors by Gensler. |
| Villahermosa | Tabasco | Centro | Primero de Mayo | Plaza Altabrisa | 2012 | c. 20,000 | Opened 2012, the chain's first store in southeastern Mexico. Two-story store of about 215,000 sq ft; rooms are organically shaped ovals and ellipses instead of a conventional racetrack aisle. |
| Veracruz | Veracruz | Boca del Río | — | Andamar Lifestyle Center | 2019 | 15,455 | First store in the state; MX$840 million (US$43 million) investment. 10,025 m² of sales floor on two levels. Design inspired by the port of Veracruz, with works by Veracruz artists. |
| León | Guanajuato | León | Campestre | Plaza Mayor | 2024 | 36,000 | First store in Guanajuato, opened 4 October 2024; cost MX$2.863 billion (about US$149 million). Built on the Tiendas de Comunidad concept. |

The group's other formats are two Casa Palacio home stores, at Antara (Polanco) and Centro Santa Fe; Boutique Palacio stores, a smaller format introduced at Paseo Acoxpa in Mexico City and in Cancún in 2010 and later also in Acapulco; and two outlets. The first outlet opened in Tlalnepantla in 1996, followed by Las Plazas Outlet Lerma in 2001 and Punta Norte in 2005.

=== Original downtown flagship ===
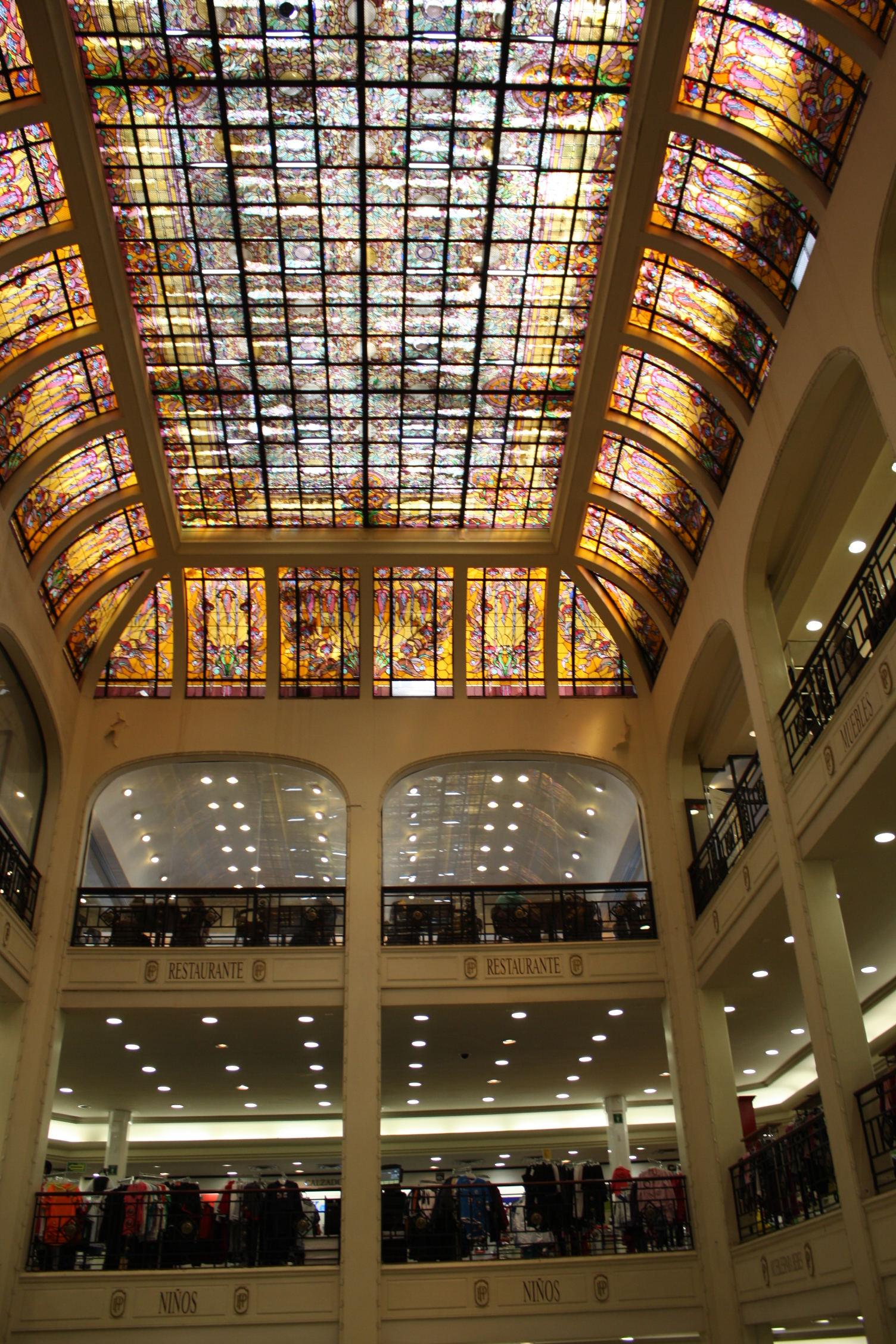
Stained-glass ceiling of the Palacio de Hierro Centro

The original store and historic flagship (1891, rebuilt and reopened 1921) still operates on the north side of Venustiano Carranza street in the Historic center of Mexico City, one block south of the Zócalo, between 5 de Febrero and 20 de Noviembre avenues.

=== Durango, Colonia Roma ===
The Durango store, on Durango street in Roma Norte, was the first branch store, opened in 1958. Designed by the architects José Aspe Sais and Vladimir Kaspé in a functionalist style, it was built in only 16 months. In 1967, under Alberto Baillères, the store was remodeled and modernized, and Harper's Bazaar called it the "Store of the Century" for its modern character. Like the downtown store, it is a freestanding building rather than part of a shopping mall.

=== Polanco flagship ===
Since its complete rebuilding, the de facto flagship is the four-story, 55,248-square-metre (594,680 sq ft) freestanding store in Polanco designed by architect Javier Sordo Madaleno, which the company nicknamed El Palacio de los Palacios ("The Palace of Palaces"). The site originally held a mall called Molière222, opened in 1997, which included a smaller Palacio store; the mall was incorporated into the store as part of the expansion. The project took five years of planning, ten months of construction and US$300 million, the largest investment in a single store in the group's history. More than 7,500 people attended the inauguration on 5 November 2015, and the store opened to the public the following day. The launch campaign, "Polanco tiene un nuevo corazón: El Palacio de los Palacios" ("Polanco has a new heart"), featured the models David Gandy, Isabeli Fontana and Carmen Dell'Orefice. TPG Architecture designed the interiors of the lower two floors and Gensler the upper two. By 2016 it was the group's highest-selling store.

Each floor takes as its theme famous neighborhoods of Mexico City, which is nicknamed the "City of Palaces":

- The ground floor, with cosmetics and luxury brand boutiques, is themed on the Paris-inspired Paseo de la Reforma and the Alameda Central park.
- The first floor (US: second floor), with the women's and children's departments, recreates Lomas de Chapultepec and Polanco.
- The second floor (US: third floor), with the gourmet food hall and the men's and technology departments, is inspired by Roma and Condesa. The food hall extends onto a 1,500 m^{2} (16,000 sq ft) terrace overlooking Polanco.
- The third floor (US: fourth floor), with the home store, emulates Jardines del Pedregal.

=== Coyoacán (Mítikah) ===
In September 2022, a new store at the Mítikah shopping center in Xoco, adjacent to Coyoacán, replaced the store opened in 1989 just to the west at the company-owned Centro Coyoacán mall. The new store has five levels and 38,000 m^{2} (410,000 sq ft) of floor space in its current phase, with plans to expand to 47,000 m^{2} (510,000 sq ft). Its centerpiece is a 9.7 m (32 ft)-high glass dome over the terrace, measuring 1,652 m^{2} (17,780 sq ft) at its base and built with 2,100 m^{2} (23,000 sq ft) of glass and 163 metric tons of metal. Interiors by TPG Architecture pay tribute to Coyoacán residents such as Frida Kahlo, Dolores del Río, Salvador Novo and Emilio "El Indio" Fernández, and the escalators are clad in murals by Yanieb Fabre. The old Centro Coyoacán store had been the company's first project with architect Javier Sordo Madaleno, who went on to design the façades of all its subsequent stores.

=== León ===
The company's first store in Guanajuato opened on 4 October 2024 at the Plaza Mayor shopping center in León, with about 36,000 m^{2} (390,000 sq ft) on three levels. It cost MX$2.863 billion (about US$149 million), (Note: Converted at the Bank of Mexico FIX rate of MX$19.21 per US dollar on 4 October 2024, the day the store opened.) and was the first store built from scratch under Alejandro Baillères. It follows the company's Tiendas de Comunidad ("community stores") concept, which incorporates local culture into the design; the León store draws on the region's colonial and mining architecture. The company plans to extend the concept to all its stores, and has named Mérida and San Luis Potosí as candidates for future stores.

=== Others ===
Four other full-line stores in Greater Mexico City each anchor an upscale mall in the metropolitan area's affluent western and southern half: Perisur (1980), Santa Fe (1993), Satélite (1998) and Interlomas (2011). The Perisur and Santa Fe stores were renovated from 2017, and the Satélite store was remodeled in November 2023 at a cost of about MX$3 billion (about US$170 million). (Note: Converted at the November 2023 Bank of Mexico FIX rate, which ranged from about MX$17.1 to MX$17.6 per US dollar during the month.)

The chain's first store outside Greater Mexico City opened in Puebla in 2002, followed by metropolitan Monterrey (in San Pedro Garza García, 2005), metropolitan Guadalajara (in Zapopan, 2008), Villahermosa (2012), Querétaro (2014), metropolitan Veracruz (in Boca del Río, 2019) and León (2024).

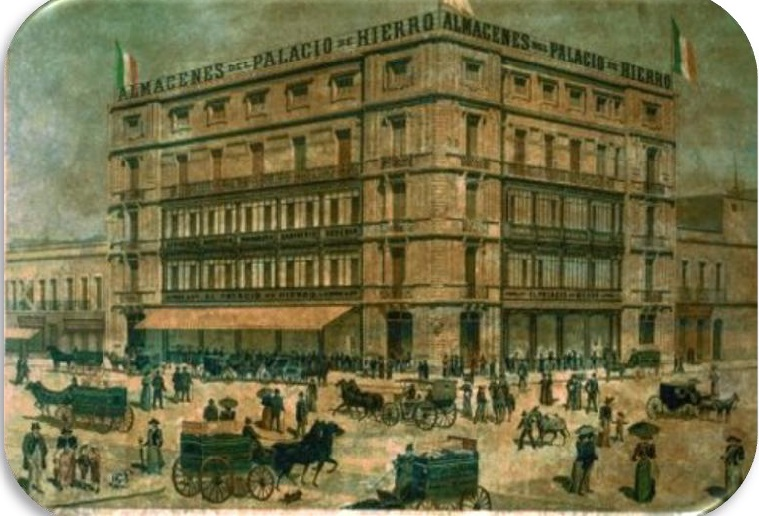
Painting of the original Palacio (Centro) in 1898

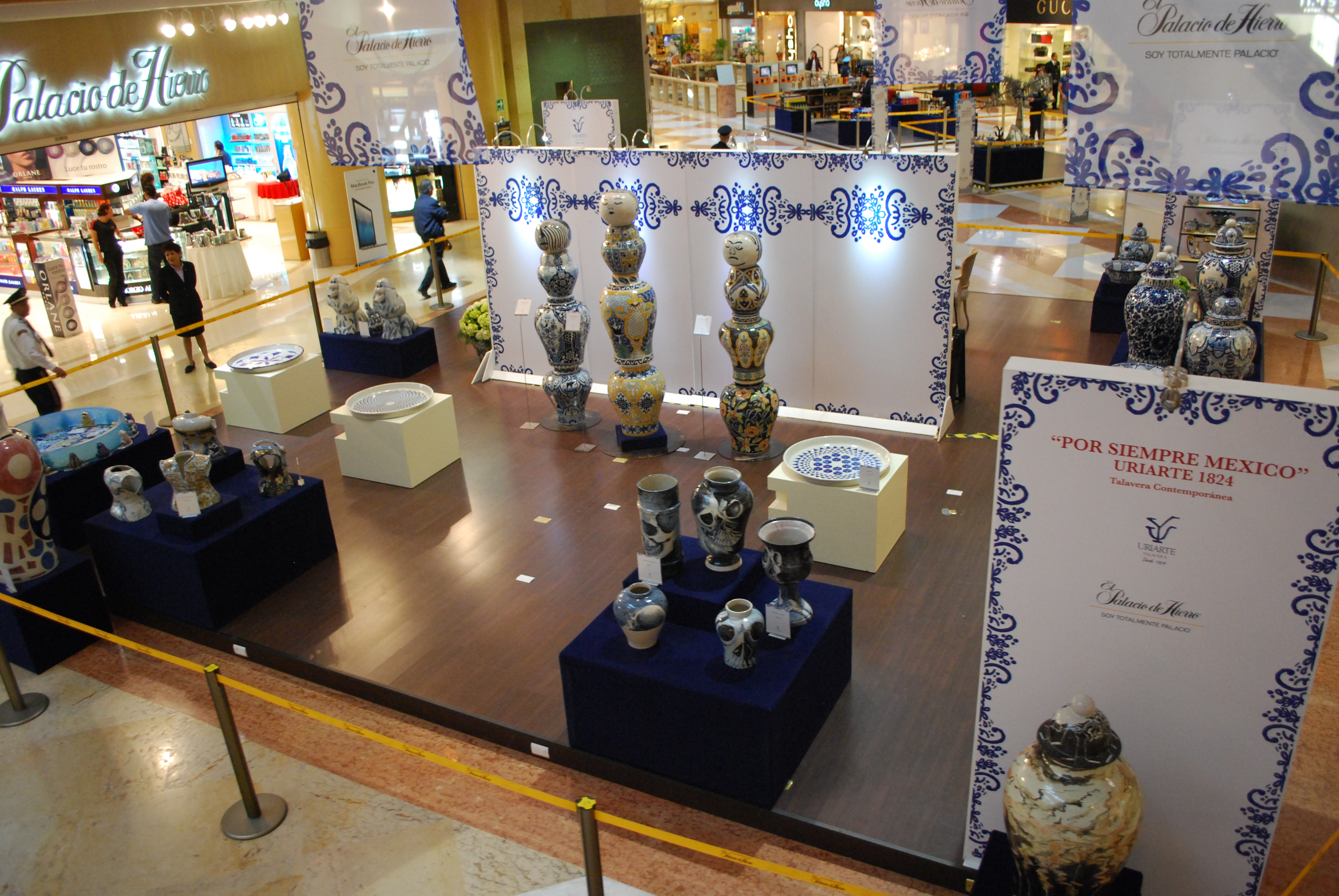
Polanco store exhibiting Uriarte Talavera

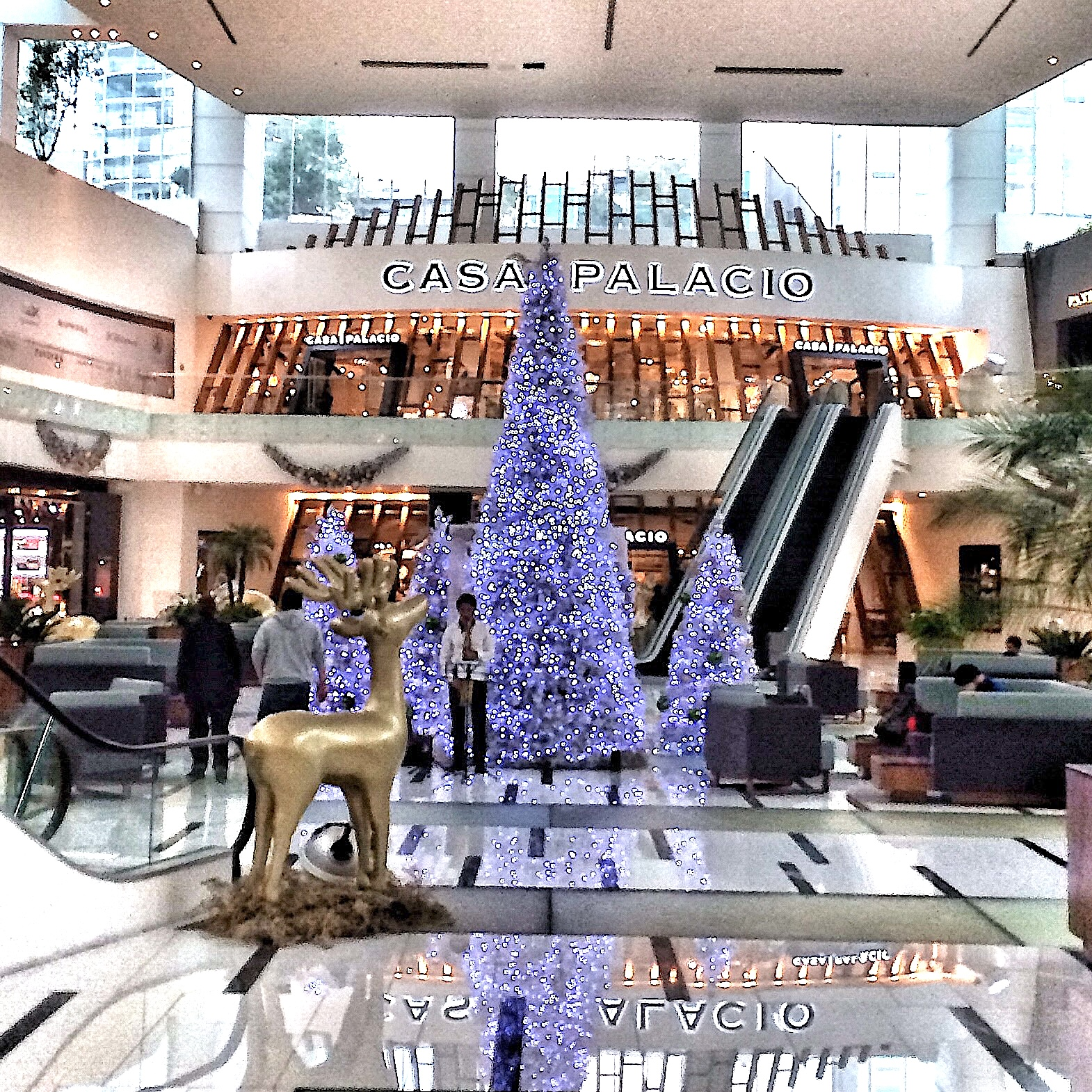
Entrance to Casa Palacio, Centro Santa Fe, 2013

== Brand boutiques ==
In 2001, Grupo Palacio de Hierro opened its first freestanding branded boutiques: Mango in the Centro Coyoacán mall and Springfield in Galerías Monterrey. By 2025 the division operated about 120 stores for brands including Adolfo Domínguez, Aldo, Mango and Michael Kors.

== See also ==
- Barcelonnette department stores of Mexico
