= Mítikah =

Skyscraper in Mexico City, Mexico

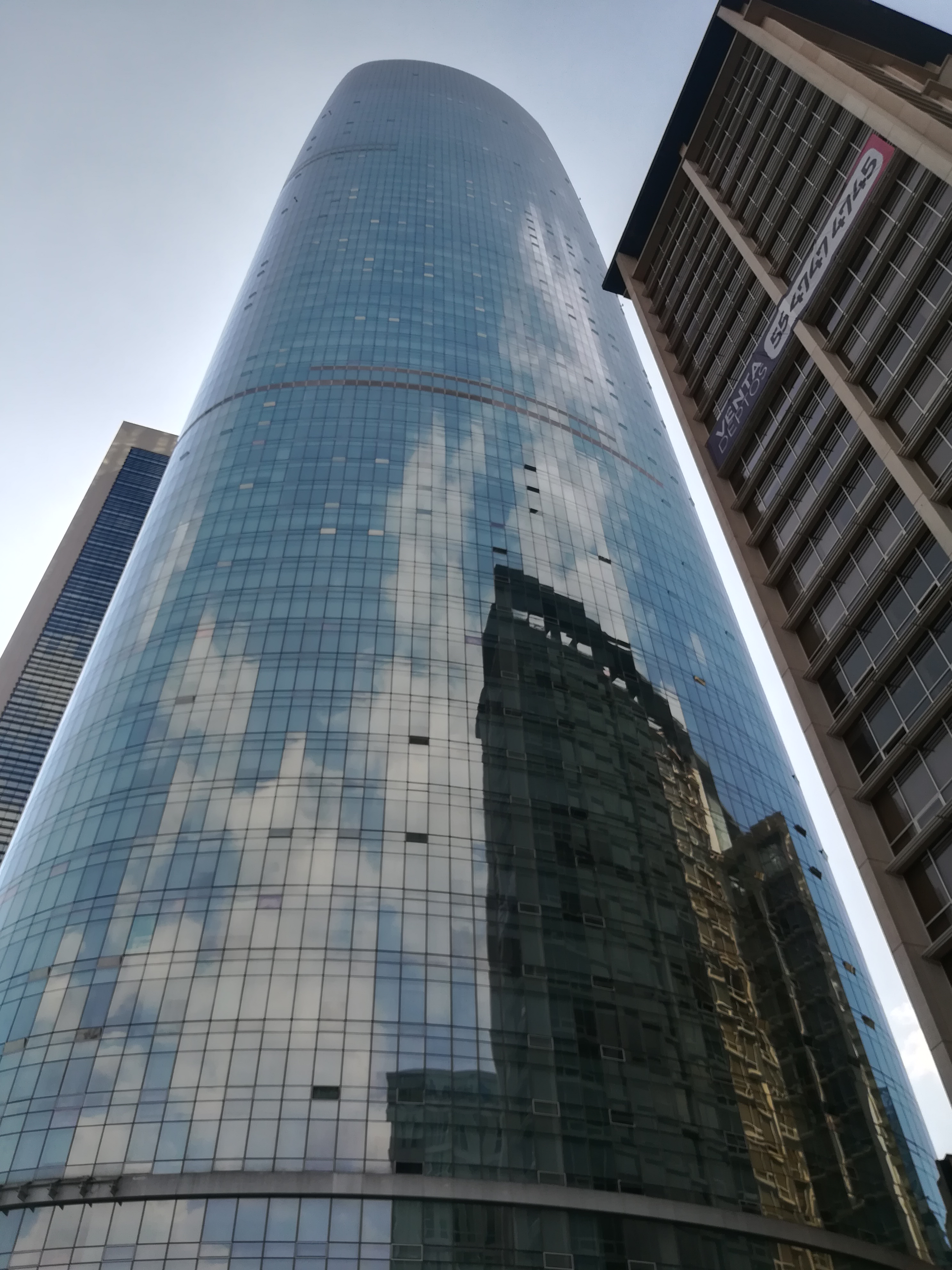
- Torre Mítikah in 2026
- Location in Mexico City

General information
- Status: Completed
- Type: Residential
- Location: Real de Mayorazgo 130 (Circuito Interior Río Churubusco 601), Xoco, Benito Juárez borough, Mexico City
- Coordinates: 19.3589934°N 99.1693421°W
- Construction started: 2012
- Completed: 2021
- Opened: 23 September 2022
- Cost: US$105,000,000 (est.)

Height
- Roof: 267 m (876 ft)

Technical details
- Floor count: 68

Design and construction
- Architect: Pelli Clarke Pelli
- Developer: Parks Desarrolladora
- Structural engineer: McNamara Salvia (WSP Cantor Seinuk) & Ideurban Tecnologías
- Main contractor: Cimesa Capital Vertical Grupo Inmobiliario

Other information
- Public transit: Coyoacán metro station (at distance)

Website
- mitikah.helloediteam.com

Mítikah (in Spanish a homonym of "Mítica" i.e. "Mythical") is a mixed-use building complex with Mexico City's tallest skyscraper in the Benito Juárez borough of southern Mexico City across the Circuito Interior inner ring road from Coyoacán. It opened on 23 September 2022. The tower was integrated with neighboring properties into a mixed-use residential, office, retail and medical complex, at around 1,000,000 sq. m., the largest in Latin America.

Its completion was initially planned for 2015, however, construction stopped in 2014. In 2015 Fibra Uno took over the project aiming to restart construction in early 2016.

Torre Mítikah is currently the tallest building in the city (at 62 stories and 267 metres (876 ft)).

In 2016, the Mítikah skyscraper project was expanded into a complex to integrate with the neighboring Centro Bancomer (currently vacant) and Centro Coyoacán mall.

== Shopping center ==
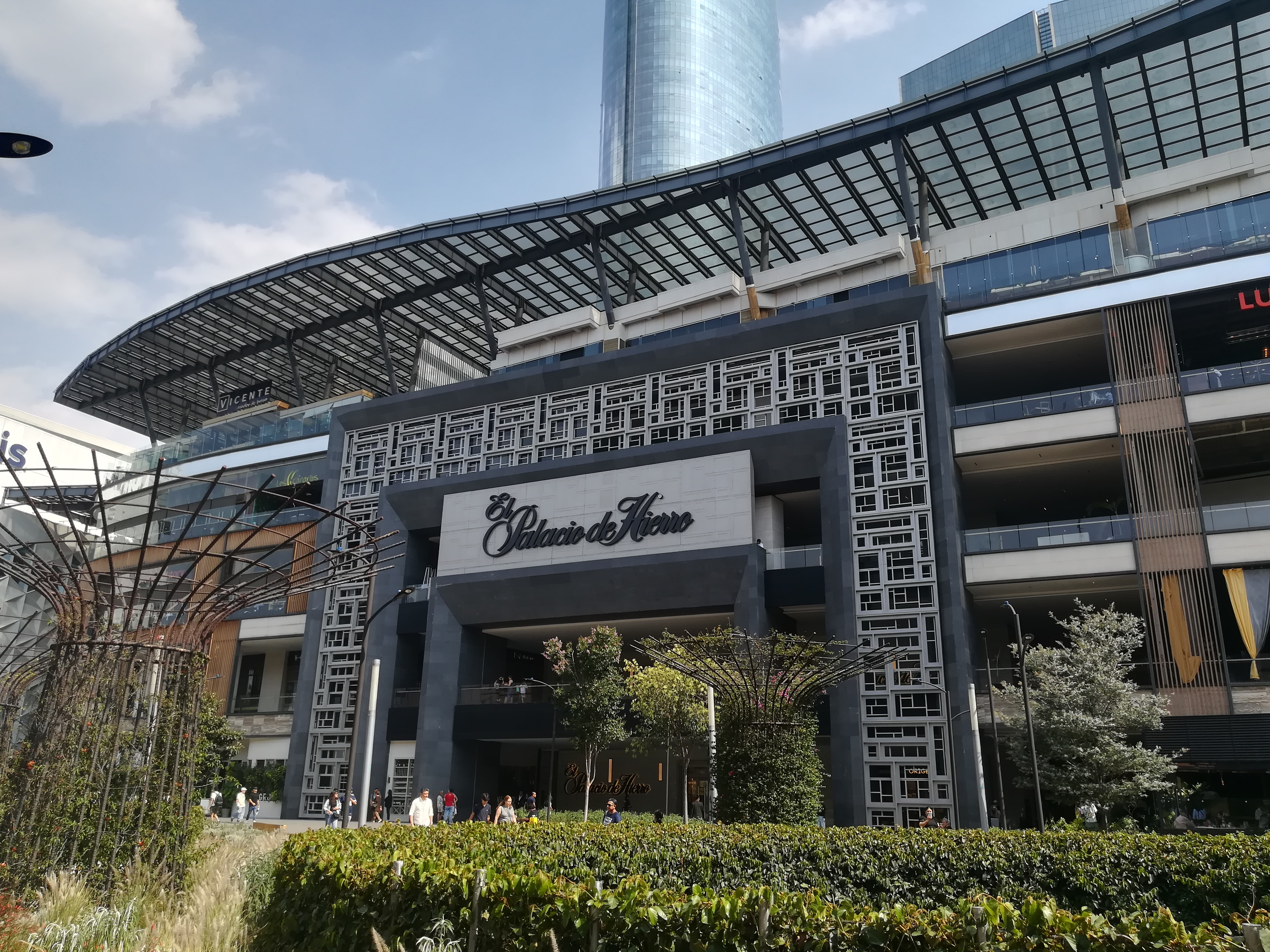
El Palacio de Hierro

As of mid-2022, the expectation is for the mall part of the complex to contain 258 commercial spaces totalling 120,000 square metres (1,300,000 sq ft) over five levels. Major anchors and brands present are to include: Cinépolis multicinemas; Palacio de Hierro and Liverpool department stores; H&M, Diesel, Victoria Secret, Abercrombie, Hollister, Berger, Mont Blanc, Hugo Boss, All Saints. Restaurants are to include branches of Mexico City chains Puerto Madero steakhouse, Negroni, Fisher's seafood, Mochomos, Hotaru, Cheesecake Factory, Shake Shack, El Califa tacos, and Sushi Roll.

The upscale Palacio de Hierro at the adjacent Centro Coyoacán mall opened a new store at Mítikah and the Centro Coyoacán mall will be demolished in order to build a new phase of Mítikah.

== See also ==
- List of tallest buildings in Mexico
