= Galerías Perinorte =

Coordinates: 19.602542°N 99.191772°W

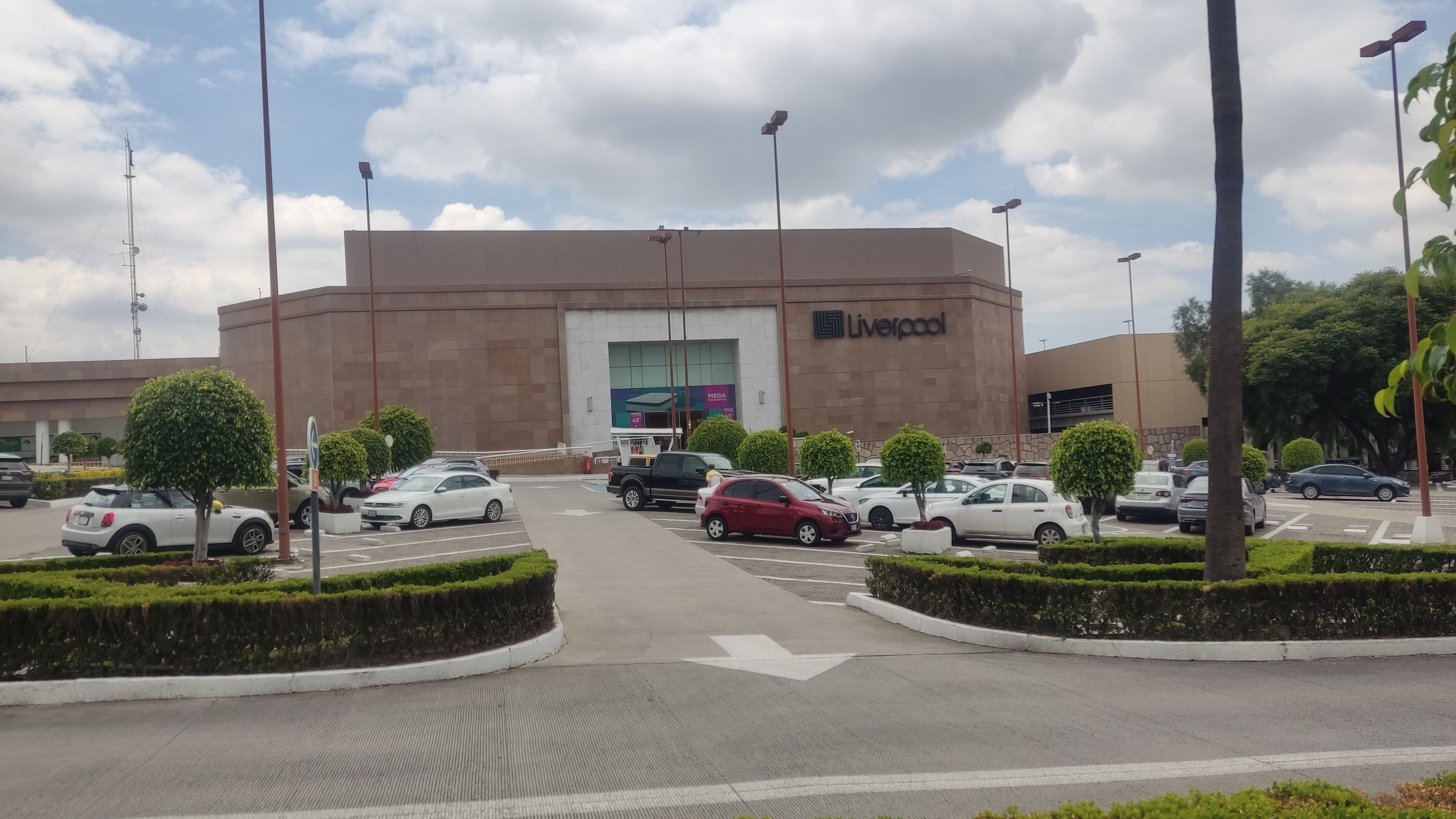
Perinorte in 2024

Galerías Perinorte is a 90,000 m^{2} (970,000 sq ft) shopping center in Cuautitlán Izcalli, State of Mexico, in the northwest part of the Mexico City metropolitan area. The architect was Manuel Rocha Díaz and it was built between 1985 and 1990 and opened in 1992. The main anchors are a Cinépolis multicinema; a Soriana Híper (formerly Gigante) hypermarket and Liverpool and Suburbia department stores. The Perinorte center, as well as Liverpool and Suburbia chains, are all owned by the El Puerto de Liverpool group. Perinorte is part of the Puerto group's shopping center division, Galerías.

The Liverpool store originally opened as a branch of Fábricas de Francia, but the chain's stores were all rebranded as either Liverpool or Suburbia in September 2018.

The name Perinorte (which along with Punto Norte, is used by other businesses near this mall) mimics the name of another Galerías-operated mall, Perisur, which opened in 1980 as the third and then-largest, US-style mall in Mexico City. The name Perisur reflected the name of the freeway along which it was located, Anillo Periférico Sur ("southern ring road"). Perinorte is located along the freeway where the Periférico Norte (north ring road) turns into the Autopista México–Querétaro (Mexico City–Querétaro Toll Road), a portion of Mexican Federal Highway 57D. Other developments have used the "Peri" prefix in various parts of Mexico.
