= Galerías =

Mexican shopping center chain

Galerías is a Mexican chain of shopping centers that is part of the El Puerto de Liverpool group, a Mexican company that consists of commercial, financial, and real estate operations. The group has three divisions:

- The commercial area operates two chains of department stores: Liverpool and Suburbia, as well as freestanding retail stores of multiple fashion brands, and the Arco Norte logistics center, under construction.
- The financial group offers insurance as well as credit to customers of the two department store chains.
- The real estate group operates the Galerías malls.

El Puerto de Liverpool is listed on the Mexican Stock Exchange (BMV) under the ticker symbol LIVEPOL. The company also holds a 50% stake in Unicomer, a company that has retail chains in 26 Latin American countries. The Group's headquarters are in Santa Fe, a suburb and a main business center in Mexico City.

All of the Galerías shopping malls are branded Galerías, except for Perisur, in deference to its historic status as the first large American-style mall in Mexico.

== Locations ==
Greater Mexico City

- Galerias Atizapán
- Galerias Coapa
- Galerías Insurgentes
- Galerías Perinorte
- Galerías Polanco
- Perisur

Toluca area

- Galerías Toluca
- Galerías Metepec

Monterrey metropolitan area

- Galerías Monterrey
- Galerías Valle Oriente
- Galerías Cumbres
- Galerías Saltillo

Central Mexico

- Bajío/Gto.: Galerias Celaya
- Guadalajara metropolitan area:
- Galerías Guadalajara
- Galerías Santa Anita (Tlajomulco)
- Galerías VD
- Tlaxcala: Galerías Tlaxcala
- Morelos: Galerías Cuernavaca
- Querétaro:
  - Galerías Querétaro
  - Galerías San Juan del Río
- Puebla: Galerías Serdán

Northern Mexico

- Galerias La Paz, Baja California Sur
- Galerías Mazatlán
- Galerías Zacatecas

Southern Mexico

- Galerías Acapulco
- Galerías Campeche
- Galerías Chilpancingo
- Galerías Mérida
- La Isla Mérida
- Galerías Tabasco,
  Villahermosa, Tabasco

== Gallery ==
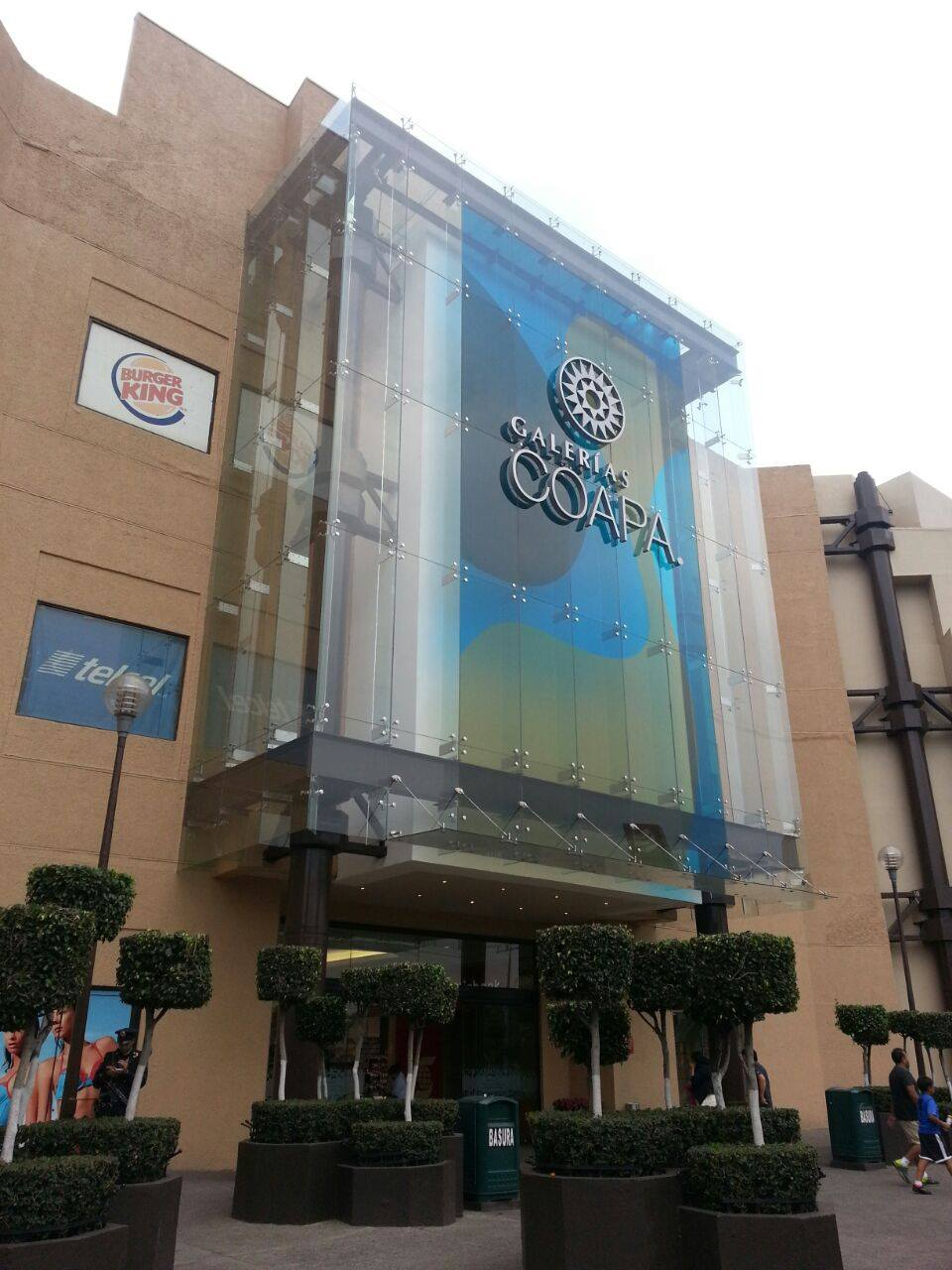
Galerías Coapa

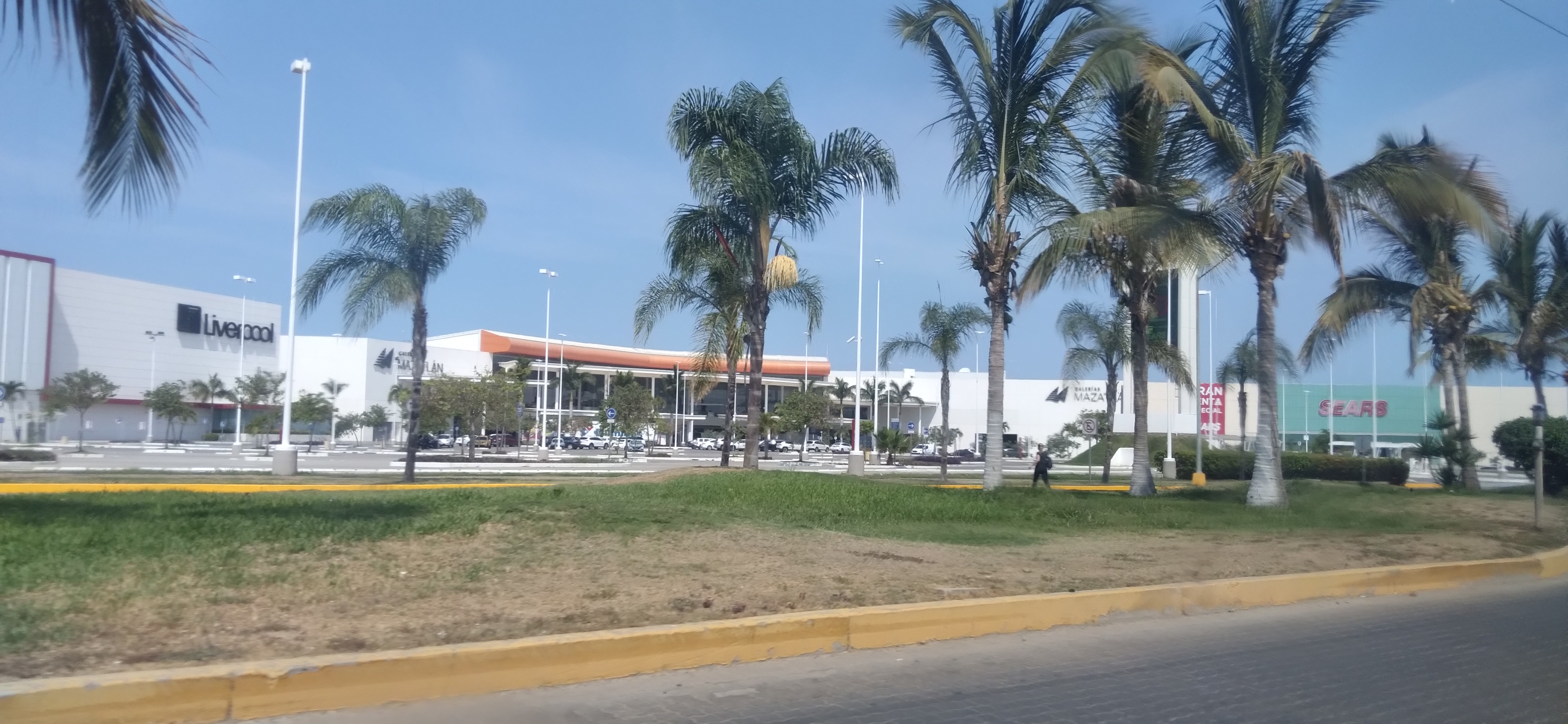
Galerías Mazatlán

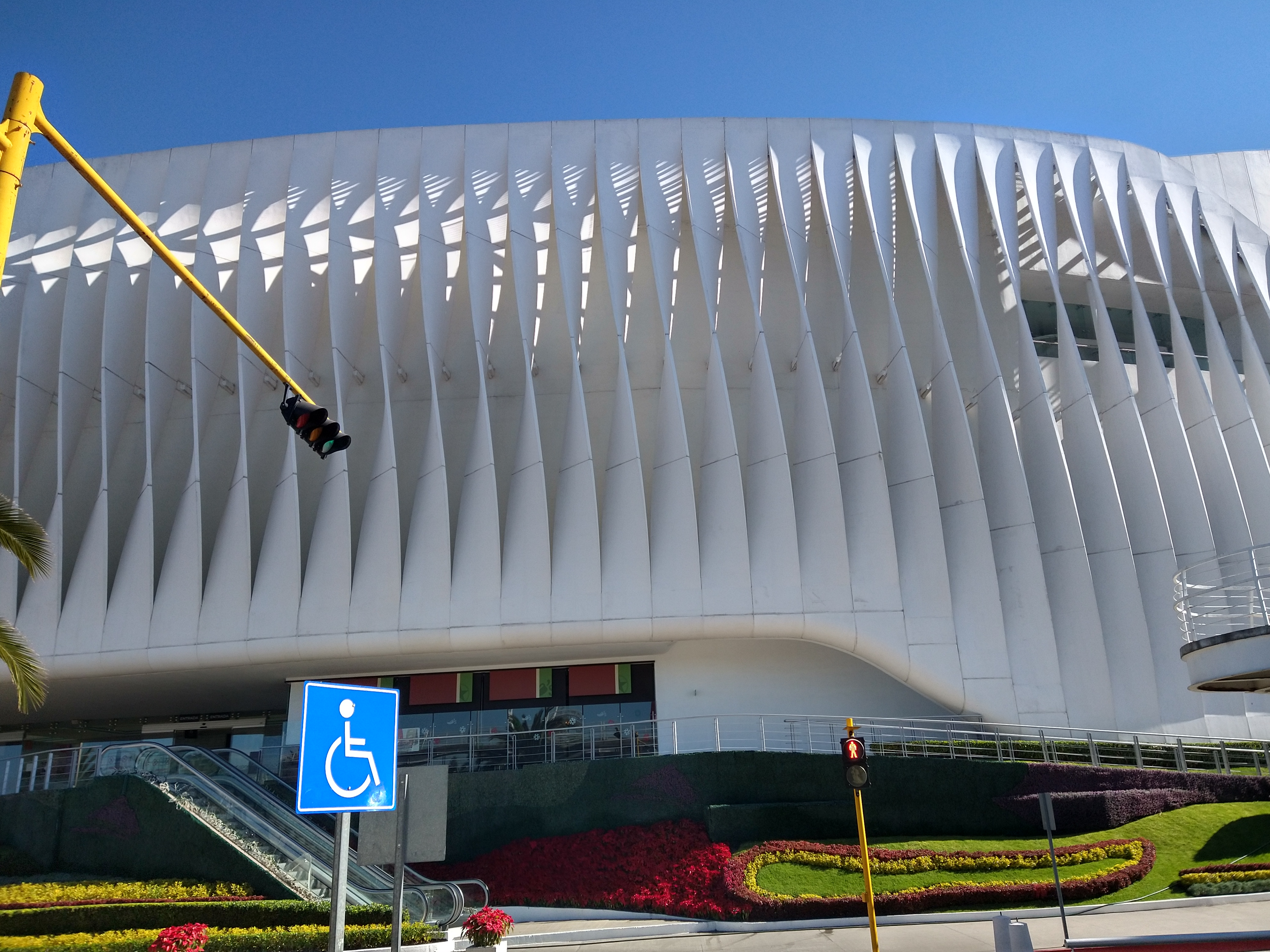
Galerías Serdán

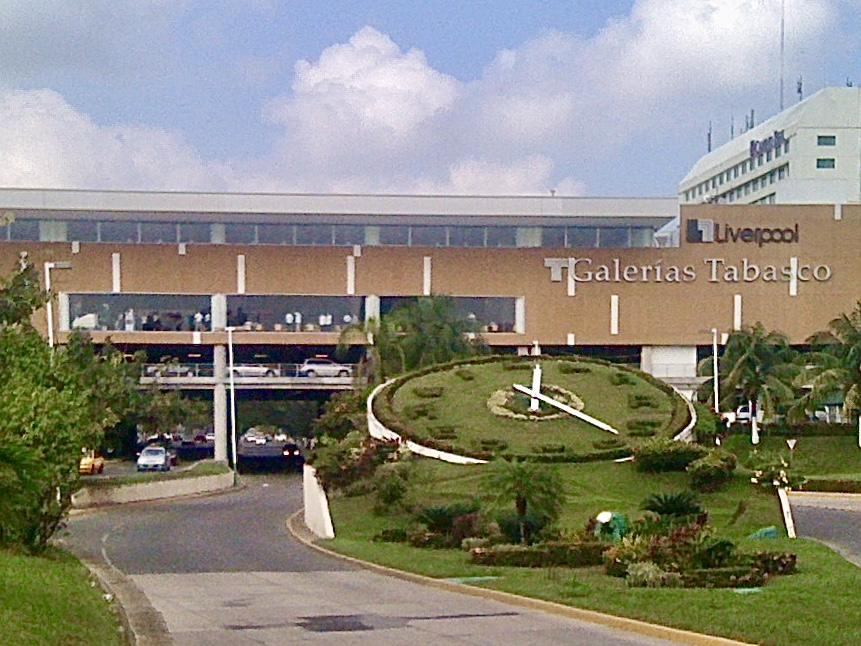
Galerías Tabasco in Villahermosa

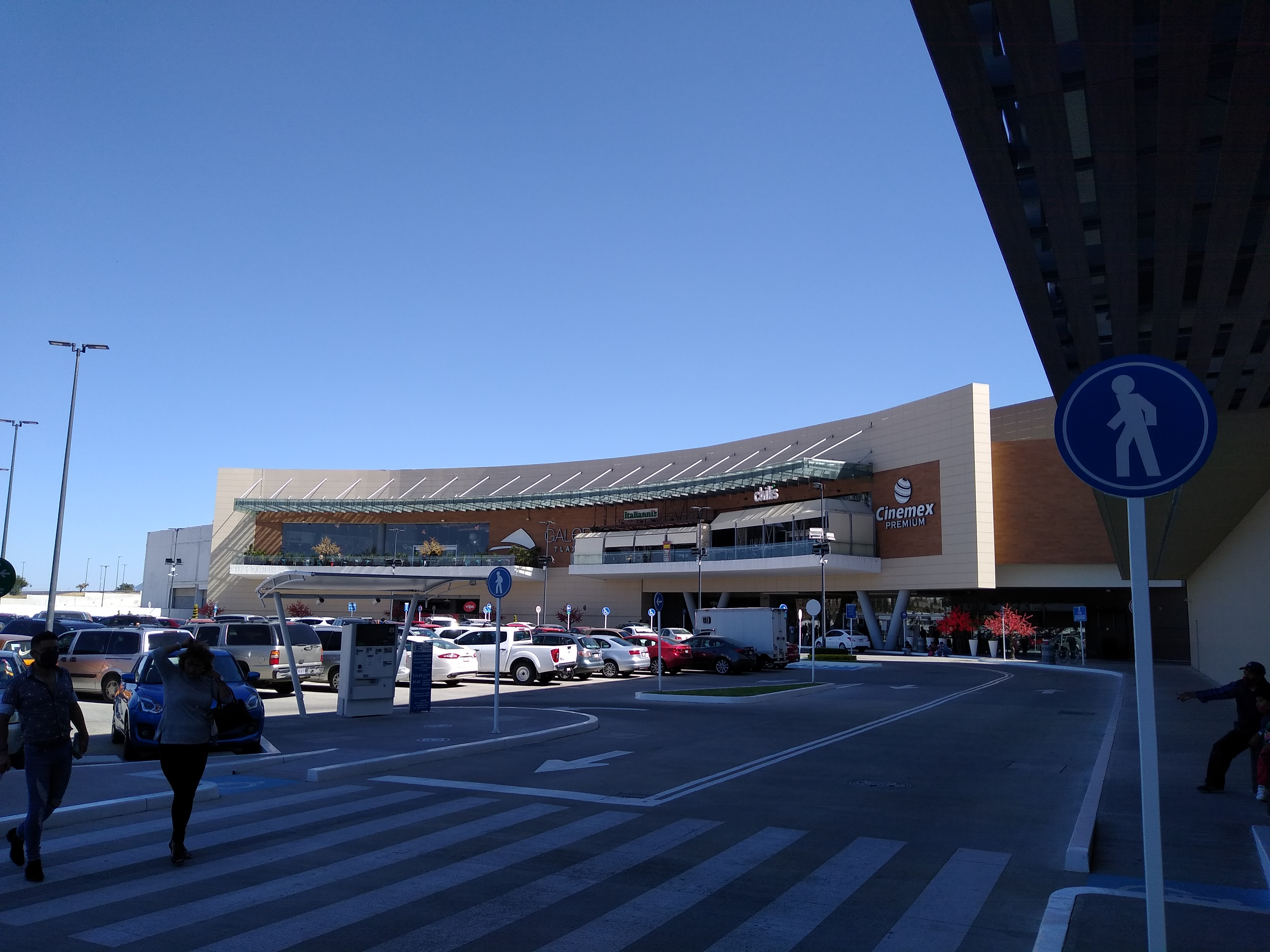
Galerías Tlaxcala

== See also ==
- El Puerto de Liverpool retail, financial and real estate group of which Galerías are a part
- Liverpool (department store), part of the group
- Suburbia (department store), part of the group
