= Galerías Insurgentes =

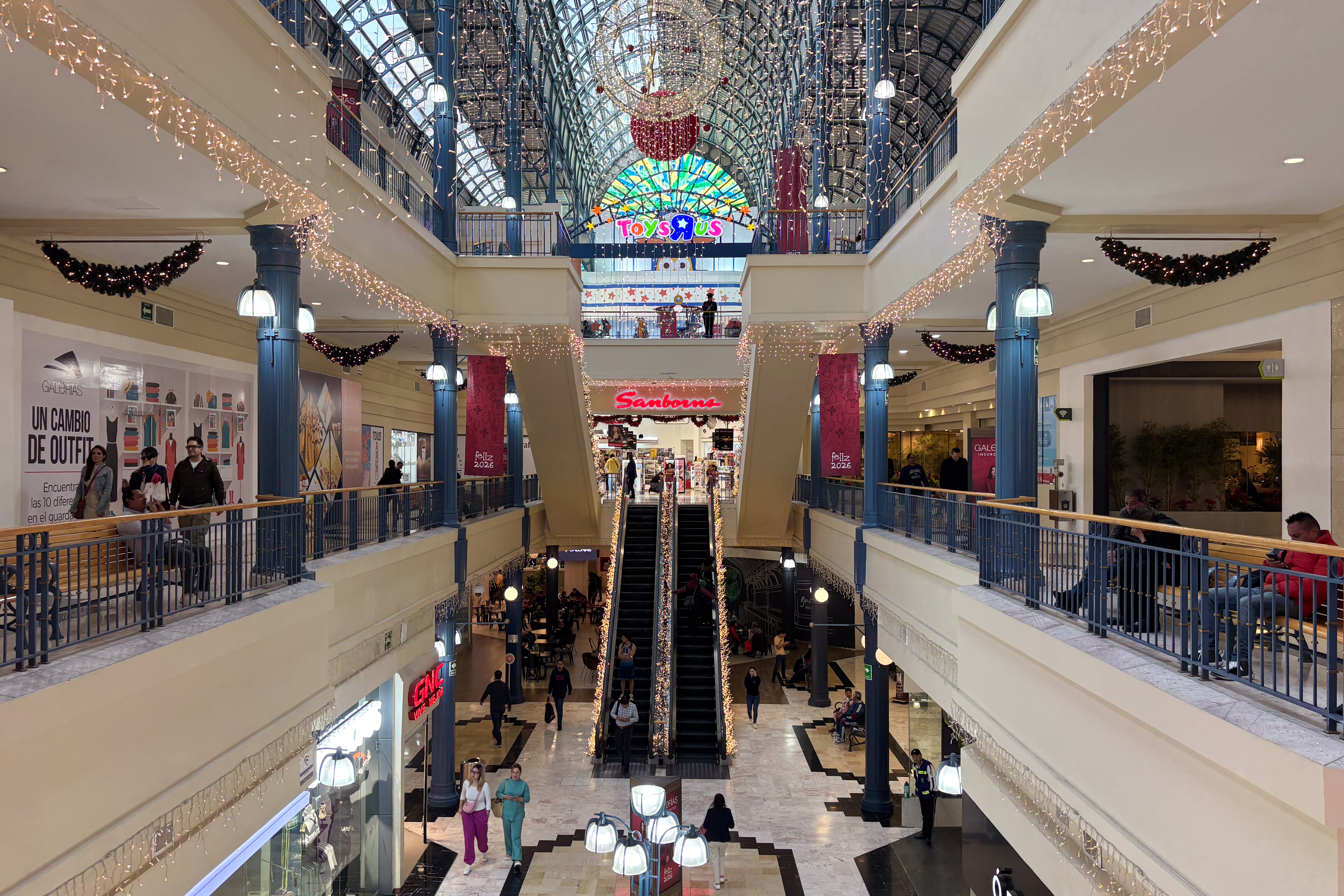
- Galerías Insurgentes in 2025

General information
- Location: Parroquia 194, Col. Del Valle, 03100, Mexico City, Mexico
- Coordinates: 19.3708397°N 99.1788973°W
- Opening: 1992
- Owner: El Puerto de Liverpool

Technical details
- Floor count: 3
- Floor area: 10,500 m^{2} (113,000 sq ft)

Design and construction
- Developer: El Puerto de Liverpool

Other information
- Number of stores: 270
- Number of anchors: 2
- Public transit: Insurgentes Sur metro station and Félix Cuevas bus station

Website
- galeriasinsurgentes.com.mx

Galerías Insurgentes, full name Centro Comercial Galerías Insurgentes, is a shopping mall on Insurgentes Sur Avenue at Parroquia in the Actipan neighborhood of Colonia Del Valle, Mexico City.

== Background ==
In 1992, Galerías Insurgentes opened as a collection of retail shops to complement the existing large Liverpool department store directly to its north. Its design is European, housing a Louvre-style glass pyramid and a towering Longines clock on its facade.

== See also ==
- Colonia del Valle
- Centro Coyoacán
