= Galerías Monterrey =

Shopping mall in Monterrey, Nuevo León

Coordinates: 25°40′53″N 100°21′15″W

Galerías Monterrey was the first shopping mall in Monterrey, Nuevo León. Founded in 1983 with Liverpool, it has grown to attract upscale fashion stores, restaurants, and movie theaters.
