= Manuel Rocha Díaz =

Mexican architect

Manuel Rocha Diaz (1936–1996) was a Mexican architect.

He was born in Mexico City in 1936 and died in 1996. He graduated in 1961 at Universidad Nacional Autónoma de Mexico where he studied with Augusto H. Álvarez. In 1960 he spent three months in Japan where he had a big influence on Japanese traditional architecture. In 1962 he married Mexican photographer Graciela Iturbide, with whom he had two sons, Manuel and Mauricio, and one daughter, Claudia who died at the age of six in 1970. He won a contest in 1970 to build the Bella Vista Golf Club in México City, and from there on he had a successful career. At the end of the 1970s he became a strong supporter of Postmodern architecture and claimed to be a follower of the internationally acclaimed Mexican architect Luis Barragán. His buildings became then a mixture of traditional Mexican and modern architecture. Rocha Diaz built in that period important works such as: the SACM recording studios (the first ones in Latin America capable of having a full orchestra with choir), the SACM cinemas that later became the Cineteca Nacional de México, the conventions center in Morelia México, etc. In 1988 he became numbered academic from the Colegio Nacional de Arquitectos. He died at 60 years old leaving two sons.

== Selected Realizations ==
- Club de Golf Bella vista, Mexico City, 1971.
- Casa redonda en tabachines, Mexico City, 1973.
- SACM recording studios, Mexico City, 1977.
- SACM cinemas, Mexico City, 1978.
- Morelia Conventions center, Morelia Mexico, 1981.
- Perinorte commercial center, México City, 1990.

== Publications ==
=== Books ===
- Manuel Rocha Diaz. En búsqueda de una arquitectura mexicana / edited by Ignacio Maya Gómez and Jaime Torres Palacios, 2005
