= Xoco =

Neighborhood of Mexico City

Coordinates: 19°22′N 99°10′W

Xoco is a neighborhood of Mexico City in Benito Juárez borough. Xoco was originally a village dating to before the Spanish conquest. Now it is an important commercial hot spot that lies just across the northern edge of Coyoacán. It is home to Mítikah, Centro Coyoacán and Patio Universidad shopping centers. Xoco is served by the Coyoacán metro station of the Mexico City Metro which belongs to line 3. The national cinematheque, the Cineteca Nacional, also stands here. There are also a cemetery, the Panteón de Xoco, the IMER, the Instituto Nacional para el Desarrollo de los Pueblos Indígenas, and the Roberto Cantoral concert hall.

== Education ==
Private schools:

- Instituto Simón Bolívar
- Colegio Buckingham
- Colegio Handel

Public schools:

- Secundaria Técnica Num. 72
