= Coyoacán metro station =

Mexico City metro station

Coyoacán
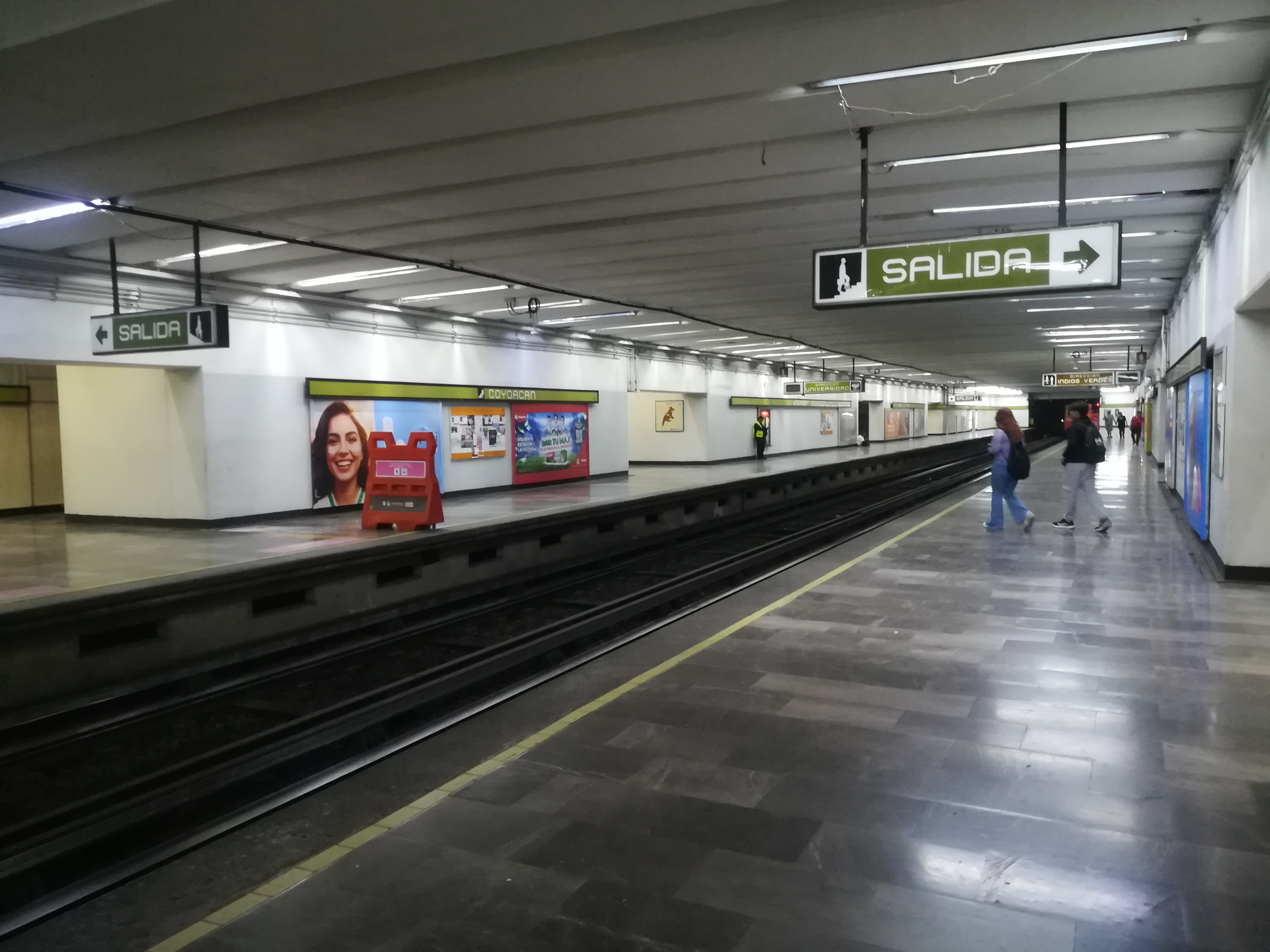
- Platforms in 2026

General information
- Location: Universidad Avenue and Real Mayorazgo Street; Benito Juárez, Mexico City; Mexico
- Coordinates: 19°21′41″N 99°10′15″W
- System: Mexico City Metro
- Owner: Government of Mexico City
- Operator: Sistema de Transporte Colectivo (STC)
- Platforms: 2 side platforms
- Tracks: 2
- Connections: Route: 200

Construction
- Structure type: Underground

Other information
- Status: In service

History
- Opened: 30 August 1983; 43 years ago
- Former names: Centro Bancomer (planned)

Passengers
- 2025: 8,898,251 (Note: The system's website counts only passenger entries into stations and does not include passengers passing through, transferring between lines, or exiting the station. The data here is limited to the most recent ten years to avoid excessive listings; earlier figures can be found in this page's history or on the Mexico City Metro website. To calculate the average daily ridership, the annual total is divided by 365 days (366 in leap years), with decimals omitted from the result. Each station per line is ranked individually, as the system counts transfer stations separately. The percentage change is calculated automatically using the data from the current year and the previous year.) ▲2.53%
- Rank: 38/195

Services
Preceding station	Mexico City Metro	Following station
Zapata toward Indios Verdes	Line 3	Viveros/Derechos Humanos toward Universidad
Route map
Location
- Location within Mexico City
- Area map

Coyoacán metro station (Note: Estación del Metro Coyoacán. Spanish pronunciation: [kojoaˈkan]. The name of the station literally means "place of coyotes" in Nahuatl.) is a station of the Mexico City Metro in the city's borough of Benito Juárez. It is an underground railway stop with two side platforms serving Line 3 (Olive Line), between Zapata and Viveros/Derechos Humanos. It was opened on 30 August 1983, providing service north toward Indios Verdes and south toward Universidad.

Coyoacán metro station services the colonias (neighborhoods) of Del Valle and Xoco, along Avenida Universidad. Despite its name, it is not located in the Coyoacán borough. Instead, its name references the nearby Coyoacán Avenue, which leads to the borough. Its pictogram depicts a coyote, as Coyoacán means "place of coyotes".

Inside, Coyoacán metro station features a cultural display and two murals by Martha Tanguma. In 2025, the station had an average daily ridership of 24,378 passenger entries, ranking it the 38th busiest stop in the network.

== Location and layout ==
Coyoacán is an underground metro station on Line 3 along Avenida Universidad in the Benito Juárez borough, in south-central Mexico City. It serves two Colonias ("neighborhoods") of Xoco and Del Valle. The surrounding area has mixed land use, mainly commercial. Nearby shopping malls include Mítikah and the defunct Centro Coyoacán.

Coyoacán stop is located between Zapata and Viveros/Derechos Humanos stations on the line. The area is serviced by Route 200 of the Red de Transporte de Pasajeros network.

The stop has three exits. The northeastern and southeastern exits lead to Colonia Xoco along Avenida Universidad, at the corner of Calle Real Mayorazgo. A third exit is found along Calle Martín Mendalde, in Colonia del Valle.

=== Landmarks ===
There are two murals inside Coyoacán metro station, named Andrómeda I and Andrómeda II. These are works made of acrylic and fiberglass, and were created by Martha Tanguma. Additionally, there are two cultural showcases at the station.

== History and construction ==
Line 3 of the Mexico City Metro was built by Ingeniería de Sistemas de Transportes Metropolitano, Electrometro, and Cometro, the latter being a subsidiary of Empresas ICA. The section including Coyoacán station formed part of a southward extension from Zapata to Universidad, opened on 30 August 1983, with service running north to Indios Verdes. The section between Coyoacán and Zapata station measures 1,153 meters (3,783 ft), while the opposite tunnel toward Viveros/Derechos Humanos station is 908 meters (2,979 ft) long.

=== Name and pictogram ===
Proposed pictogram for the Centro Bancomer metro station

Originally, Coyoacán metro station was projected to be named "Centro Bancomer", after the then-existing headquarters of Banco del Comercio (Bancomer)—which was later acquired by Banco Bilbao Vizcaya Argentaria (BBVA) and became BBVA Bancomer. However, due to the metro system's rules, commercial names are prohibited in station names. As a result, and due to the lack of other major landmarks in the area, the station was renamed "Coyoacán" after nearby Coyoacán Avenue, located one block away and leading to the borough of Coyoacán. The name can be confusing for those unfamiliar with the area, as the station is not located within the borough itself.

Coyoacán comes from the Nahuatl Coyohuacán, meaning "place of coyotes". The station's pictogram depicts a coyote with a circle at its center representing a spring, in reference to the springs that once existed in the area.

== Ridership ==
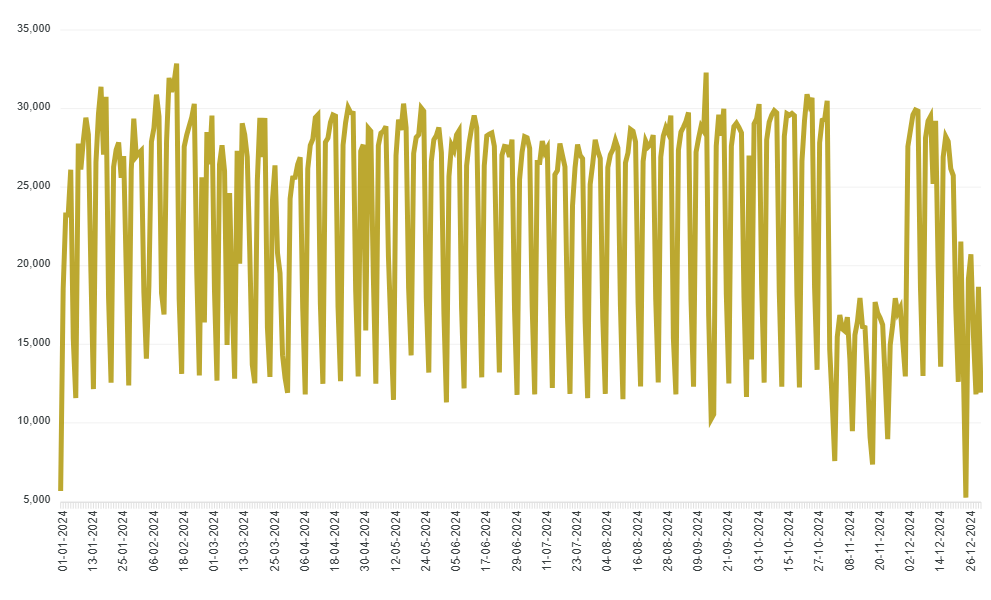
Daily ridership for Coyoacán station in 2024

According to official data, before the impact of the COVID-19 pandemic, the station recorded between 23,800 and 26,800 average daily entries from 2016 to 2019. In 2025, it recorded 8,898,251 passenger entries, ranking 38th among the system's 195 stations.

Annual passenger ridership
Year	Ridership	Average daily	Rank	% change	Ref.
2025	8,898,251	24,378	38/195	+2.53%	
2024	8,678,323	23,711	39/195	+2.42%	
2023	8,473,595	23,215	38/195	+18.70%	
2022	7,138,504	19,557	47/195	+88.16%	
2021	3,793,860	10,394	80/195	−22.75%	
2020	4,911,086	13,418	60/195	−49.79%	
2019	9,780,261	26,795	52/195	+3.48%	
2018	9,451,638	25,894	54/195	+8.65%	
2017	8,699,196	23,833	61/195	−0.24%	
2016	8,719,798	23,824	64/195	−5.39%	
