= Viveros/Derechos Humanos metro station =

Mexico City metro station

Viveros/Derechos Humanos
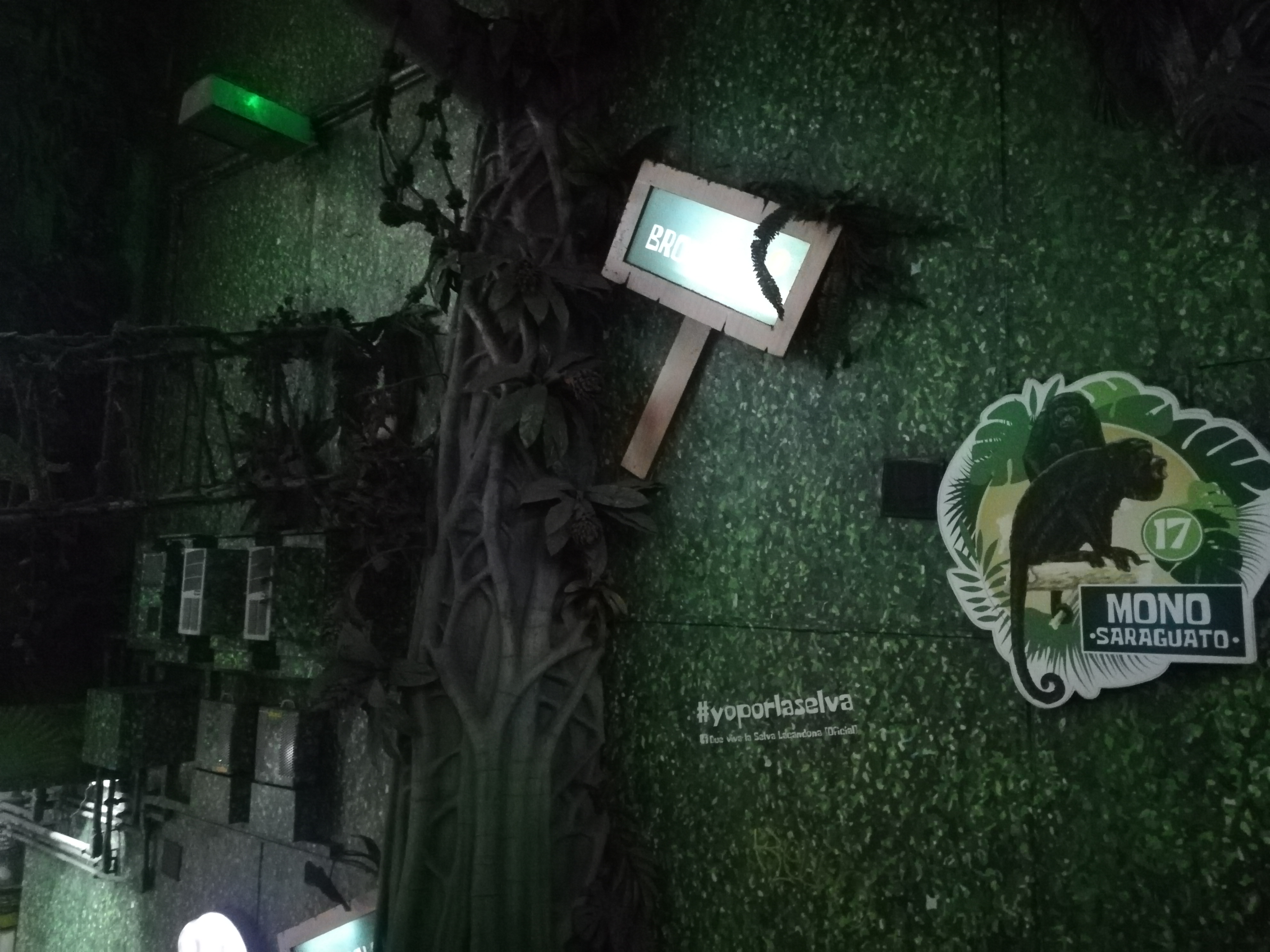
- Lobby

General information
- Location: Barrio de Santa Catarina, Coyoacán; Mexico City; Mexico
- Coordinates: 19°21′13″N 99°10′34″W
- System: Mexico City Metro
- Platforms: 2 side platforms
- Tracks: 2

Construction
- Structure type: Underground
- Platform levels: 1
- Parking: No
- Cycle facilities: No
- Accessible: Yes

History
- Opened: 30 August 1983; 42 years ago
- Former names: Viveros

Passengers
- 2025: 6,227,564 (Note: The data here is limited to the most recent ten years to avoid excessive listings; earlier figures can be found in this page's history or on the Mexico City Metro website. To calculate the average daily ridership, the annual total is divided by 365 days (366 in leap years), with decimals omitted from the result. Each station per line is ranked individually, as the system counts transfer stations separately. The percentage change is calculated automatically using the data from the current year and the previous year.) ▼0.05%
- Rank: 73/195

Services
Preceding station	Mexico City Metro	Following station
Coyoacán toward Indios Verdes	Line 3	Miguel Ángel de Quevedo toward Universidad
Route map
Location
- Location within Mexico City
- Area map

Viveros/Derechos Humanos (Spanish pronunciation; formerly Viveros) is a metro station along Line 3 of the Mexico City Metro. It is located between the Álvaro Obregón and Coyoacán boroughs of Mexico City.

== General information ==
The station logo depicts the silhouette of a plant, and the metro station is named after the nearby Viveros de Coyoacán arboretum and nursery (parts of which are a publicly accessible park and a popular area for recreation), founded by engineer Miguel Ángel de Quevedo in the former ranch of Panzacola. The station opened on 30 August 1983.

Viveros / Derechos Humanos serves the Colonia Barrio de Santa Catarina, Florida, and Axotla neighborhoods, and is mainly used to link with the bus lines on Avenida Universidad.

Inside the station is a mural by artist Jason Schell entitled A Sunday Afternoon Under Mexico City (Una Tarde Dominical Bajo la Ciudad de Mexico).

=== Ridership ===
Annual passenger ridership
Year	Ridership	Average daily	Rank	% change	Ref.
2025	6,227,564	17,061	73/195	−0.05%
2024	6,230,936	17,024	68/195	+7.41%
2023	5,801,141	15,893	78/195	+7.80%
2022	5,381,439	14,743	80/195	+34.21%
2021	4,009,630	10,985	76/195	−10.30%
2020	4,469,994	12,213	77/195	−42.15%
2019	7,727,513	21,171	82/195	−1.30%
2018	7,829,573	21,450	82/195	−2.55%
2017	8,034,608	22,012	74/195	−5.42%
2016	8,495,111	23,210	72/195	−0.26%

== Nearby ==
- Viveros de Coyoacán, public 38.9 hectares park.

== Exits ==
- East: Avenida Universidad, Barrio de Santa Catarina
- West: Avenida Universidad and Hortensia street, Barrio de Santa Catarina
