= Graciela Iturbide =

Mexican photographer (born 1942)

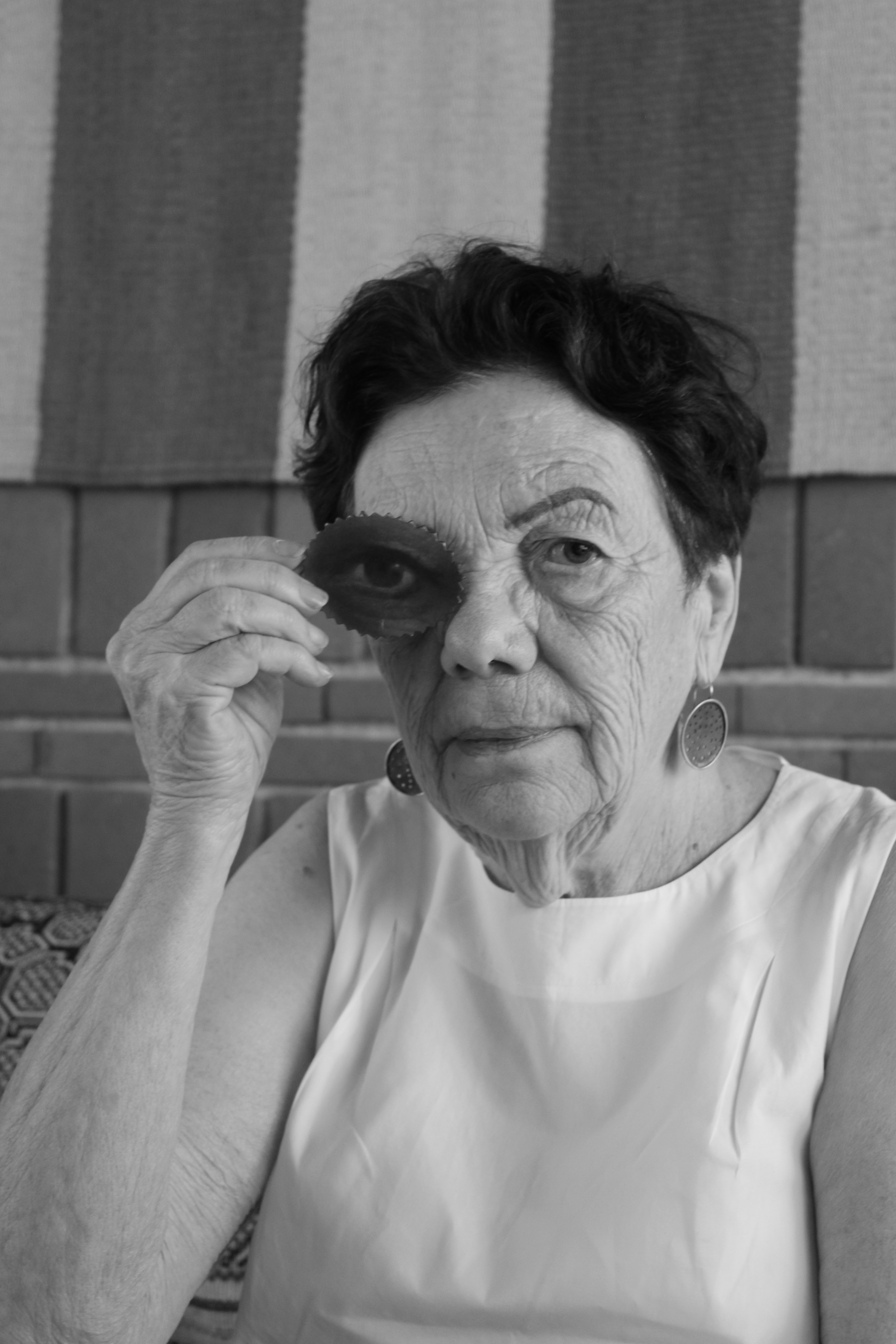
- Born: Graciela Iturbide; May 16, 1942 (age 84); Mexico City, Mexico
- Education: Centro Universitario de Estudios Cinematográficos, Universidad Nacional Autónoma de México
- Known for: Photography
- Awards: Hasselblad Award 2008.
- Website: gracielaiturbide.org/en/

Graciela Iturbide (born May 16, 1942) is a Mexican photographer. Her work has been exhibited internationally, and is included in many major museum collections such as the San Francisco Museum of Modern Art and The J. Paul Getty Museum.

== Biography ==
Iturbide was born in Mexico City, Mexico in 1942, to traditional Catholic parents. The eldest of thirteen children, she attended Catholic school and was exposed to photography early on in life. Her father took pictures of her and her siblings, and she got her first camera when she was 11 years old. When she was a child, her father put all the photographs in a box; Iturbide later said: "it was a great treat to go to the box and look at these photos, these memories."

She married the architect Manuel Rocha Díaz in 1962 and had three children over the next eight years: sons Manuel and Mauricio, and a daughter, Claudia, who died at the age of six in 1970. Manuel is now a composer and sound artist and has lectured at California College of the Arts. Mauricio took after his father and became an architect.

== Photography career ==
In 1970 Iturbide turned to photography after the death of her six-year-old daughter Claudia. She studied at the Centro Universitario de Estudios Cinematográficos at the Universidad Nacional Autónoma de México with the intention of becoming a film director. She realized how drawn she was to photography, which was Manuel Álvarez Bravo's area of expertise. He was a teacher at the university as well as a cinematographer, photographer, and subsequently became her mentor. She traveled with Bravo between 1970 and 1971 and learned that "there is always time for the pictures you want." In 1971 she was awarded the W. Eugene Smith Grant, and a scholarship at the Guggenheim College.

=== Style and influence ===
Iturbide photographs everyday life, almost entirely in black-and-white, following her curiosity and photographing when she sees what she likes. She was inspired by the photography of Josef Koudelka, Henri Cartier-Bresson, Sebastião Salgado, and Manuel Álvarez Bravo. Her self-portraits especially reflect and showcase Bravo's influence and play with innovation and attention to detail. Iturbide eschews labels and calls herself complicit with her subjects. With her way of relating to those she is photographing, she is said to allow her subjects to come to life, producing poetic portraits. She became interested in the daily life of Mexico's indigenous cultures and people (the Zapotec, Mixtec, and Seri) and has photographed life in Mexico City, Juchitán, Oaxaca and on the Mexican-American border (La Frontera). With focus on identity, sexuality, festivals, rituals, daily life, death, and roles of women, Iturbide's photographs share visual stories of cultures in constant transitional periods. There's also juxtaposition within her images between urban vs rural life, and indigenous vs modern life. Iturbide's main concern has been the exploration and investigation of her own cultural environment. She uses photography as a way of understanding Mexico; combining indigenous practices, assimilated Catholic practices and foreign economic trade under one scope. Art critic, Oscar C. Nates, has described Iturbide's work as "anthropoetic."

=== "Angelitos" ===
Some of Iturbide's earliest works involved the documenting of angelitos, young or infant children that had died, and their burial. Iturbide became practically obsessed with death, most of her images from this time period is that of cemeteries or families heading to a cemetery. Despite this, art critic Oscar C. Nates notes that death in Iturbide's photographs is not gloomy, but poetic. Iturbide's obsession with death only ceased when she encountered a corpse of a man when following a family to bury an angelito. This was seen as Iturbide's sign to move on from only documenting death.

=== "Mujer Ángel" ===
In 1978, Iturbide was commissioned by the ethnographic archive of the National Indigenous Institute of Mexico to work on a series about Mexico's Seri Indians – a group of fishermen living in the Sonora desert along the Arizona/Mexico border. She was in Punta Chueca for a month and a half working on the series. There were about 500 people within the community. It was while working for this series that her photograph called "Mujer Ángel" was taken. The image depicts a Seri woman while on an expedition to a cave with indigenous paintings. The woman “looked as if she could fly off into the desert” and was carrying a tape recorder which she had exchanged for handicrafts with Americans. "Mujer Ángel" was used by the politically charged metal group Rage Against the Machine for their single "Vietnow" in 1997. "Mujer Ángel" and the Seri People series was part of the Museum of Fine Arts, Boston 2019 photography exhibition "Graciela Iturbide's Mexico".

In 1979, Iturbide was asked by painter Francisco Toledo to photograph the Juchitán people who form part of the Zapotec culture native to Oaxaca, Mexico. It is traditionally a matriarchal society in which the women are economically, politically, and sexually independent. The women run the market, and men are not allowed to enter with the exception of gay men, whom they call "muxes" in the Zapotec language. This experience as a photographer shaped Iturbide's views on life. Iturbide worked on this series for almost 10 years, ending in 1988. This collection resulted in the book Juchitán de las Mujeres.

=== "Nuestra Señora de Las Iguanas" and "Magnolia" ===
"Nuestra Señora de Las Iguanas" (1979)

Some of the inspiration for her next work came from her support of feminist causes. Her well-known photograph, "Nuestra Señora de Las Iguanas" (Our Lady of the Iguanas) came from her photo essay "Juchitán of the Women (1979–86)" which was also shot in Juchitán de Zaragoza. This icon became so popular that there is a statue of this woman made in Juchitán as well as murals and graffiti. Filmmakers Susan Streitfeld and Julie Hébert used this photo as an icon in their film Female Perversions (1996). "Nuestra Señora de Las Iguanas" is also part of the 2019 series exhibition at the Museum of Fine Arts in Boston: Graciela Iturbide's Mexico. Comparisons have been made between Iturbide's "Nuestra Señora de las Iguanas" and La Virgen de Guadalupe, showing an indigenous woman from Juchitan as a rendition of La Virgen of Guadalupe, the image serves as a reminder of the hardships and injustices that indigenous communities in Mexico have suffered. However, her work in Juchitán was not only about women, as she also photographed "Magnolia", a photo of a nonbinary person wearing a dress and looking at themselves in a mirror.

"Juchitan de Las Mujeres"

Iturbide created this series between the years of 1979 to 1989 when she became entranced with the women-centered community of the Zapotec Indians, located in the Southern Mexican state of Oaxaca; the most purely indigenous community in Mexico. Iturbide found these women's political, sexual, and economic freedom deeply inspiring.

Iturbide's method of documentation was not like the common distanced photographer. Instead, Iturbide took the time to get to know the women on a personal level. By doing so, Iturbide gained their trust and permission to photograph them. With their trust, Iturbide was invited to film many of their private celebrations and she became exposed to the Zapotec people through the eyes of the indigenous women. Iturbide's work in Juchitan helped bring a newfound enthusiasm by the Mexican people for its indigenous communities and helped bring forth a new wave of feminism to the country.

Viewers can explore images of Iturbide's "Juchitan de Las Mujeres" series at her website.

=== Other works ===
Iturbide has also photographed Mexican-Americans in the White Fence (street gang) barrio of Eastside Los Angeles as part of the documentary book A Day in the Life of America (1987). She has worked in Argentina (in 1996), India (where she made her well-known photo, "Perros Perdidos" (Lost Dogs)), and the United States (an untitled collection of photos shot in Texas).

One of the major concerns in her work has been "to explore and articulate the ways in which a vocable such as 'Mexico' is meaningful only when understood as an intricate combination of histories and practices."

She is a founding member of the Mexican Council of Photography. She continues to live and work in Coyoacán, Mexico.

In awarding her the 2008 Hasselblad Award, the Hasselblad Foundation said:

Graciela Iturbide is considered one of the most important and influential Latin American photographers of the past four decades. Her photography is of the highest visual strength and beauty. Graciela Iturbide has developed a photographic style based on her strong interest in culture, ritual and everyday life in her native Mexico and other countries. Iturbide has extended the concept of documentary photography, to explore the relationships between man and nature, the individual and the cultural, the real and the psychological. She continues to inspire a younger generation of photographers in Latin America and beyond.

Some of Iturbide's recent work documents refugees and migrants. In her work "Refugiados" (2015), offers a stark contrast between love and family and danger and violence showing a smiling mother holding her child in front of a hand-painted mural of Mexico dotted with safety and danger zones.

The largest institutional collection of Iturbide's photographs in the United States is preserved at the Wittliff collections, Texas State University, San Marcos, TX.

== Publications ==
- Billeter, Erika, ed. (1994). Fiesta und Ritual: Graciela Iturbides Mexiko [Fiesta and Ritual: Graciela Iturbides Mexico] (in German). Graciela Iturbide (artist). Berne, Switzerland: Benteli. ISBN 9783716509357.
- Images of the spirit. New York: Aperture Foundation, 1996. ISBN 0-89381-681-7.
- La Forma y la Memoria = "Form and Memory". Monterrey, Mexico: Museo de Arte Contemporáneo de Monterrey, 1996. ISBN 978-9686623321.
- Eyes to fly with: portraits, self-portraits, and other photographs. Austin, University of Texas, 2006. ISBN 0-292-71462-9.
- Iturbide. Madrid: tf. editores, 2003. ISBN 84-96209-48-2.
- Graciela Iturbide. London: Phaidon, 2006. Edited and with an essay by Marta Gili. ISBN 9780714845708. Phaidon, 2011.
- Torrijos: The Man and the Myth. Madrid: Umbrage, 2008. ISBN 978-1-884167-68-3.
- Graciela Iturbide: Juchitán. Los Angeles: J. Paul Getty Museum, 2007. ISBN 9780892369058. Barcelona: RM, 2011. ISBN 978-8492480531.
- Des Oiseaux. Paris: Xavier Barral, 2019. ISBN 978-2-36511-248-2.
- White Fence. Mexico: RM, 2024. ISBN 978-8419233691.
- Graciela Iturbide. New York, 2025. ISBN 978-84-10290-23-5

== Awards ==
- 1987: W. Eugene Smith Grant from the W. Eugene Smith Memorial Fund
- 1988: Guggenheim Fellowship from the John Simon Guggenheim Memorial Foundation
- 1990: International Grand Prize, Hokkaido, Japan
- 1991: Award Recontres Photographiques, Arles, France
- 1998: First prize, Mois de la Photo, France
- 2008:
  - Hasselblad Foundation Photography Award
  - National Prize for Arts: Fine Arts
- 2021: Outstanding Contribution to Photography, Sony World Photography Awards
- 2022: Induction into the International Photography Hall of Fame and Museum
- 2025: Princess of Asturias Prize for the Arts

== Exhibitions ==
- 1980: Graciela Iturbide, New Mexico
- 1990: External Encounters, Internal Imaginings: The Photographs of Graciela Iturbide, at the Museum of Modern Art in San Francisco, CA
- 1991: Rencontres d'Arles Festival, Arles, France
- 1997–1998: Images of Spirit at the Philadelphia Museum of Art, Philadelphia, PA
- 2000: Images of Spirit: Photographs by Graciela Iturbide, National Museum of Women in the Arts, Washington, DC
- 2003: Pajaros et Paisajes (Birds and Sights), Robert Miller Gallery, New York City
- 2003: Pajaros et Paisajes, OMG Gallery for Contemporary Art, Düsseldorf, Germany
- 2007–2008: The Goat's Dance: Photographs by Graciela Iturbide, J. Paul Getty Museum, Los Angeles, LA
- 2008: Torrijos: The Man and the Myth, Americas Society, New York
- 2011: Rencontres d'Arles Festival, Arles, France
- 2011: Retrospective, Pinacoteca, São Paulo, Brazil
- 2015: Naturatta | Baño de Frida, Helinä Rautavaara Museum, Espoo, Finland
- 2016: Graciela Iturbide: A Lens to See, Ruiz-Healy Art, San Antonio, TX, for Fotoseptiembre USA
- 2017: Revolution and Ritual: The Photographs of Sara Castrejon, Graciela Iturbide, and Tatiana Parcero, Ruth Chandler Williamson Gallery at Scripps College, Claremont, CA
- 2019: "Graciela Iturbide's Mexico", Museum of Fine Arts, Boston MA
- 2019: "Graciela Iturbide's Mexico", Minneapolis Museum of Art, Minneapolis MN
- 2020: "Graciela Iturbide's Mexico", National Museum of Women in the Arts
- 2025-26: "Graciela Iturbide: Serious Play," International Center of Photography, New York City
- 2026: "Graciela Iturbide: Between Two Worlds" San Francisco Museum of Modern Art, San Francisco

== Collections ==
Iturbide's work is held in the following permanent collections:

- Academy Art Museum, Easton, MD
- Brooklyn Museum, Brooklyn, NY
- Museum of Modern Art, New York City
- Centre Georges Pompidou, Paris
- Los Angeles County Museum of Art, Los Angeles, CA
- National Museum of Women in the Arts, Washington, D.C.
- San Francisco Museum of Modern Art, San Francisco, CA
- J. Paul Getty Museum, Los Angeles, CA
- Wittliff collections, Texas State University, San Marcos, TX
- Yale University Art Gallery, New Haven, CT
