= Perisur =

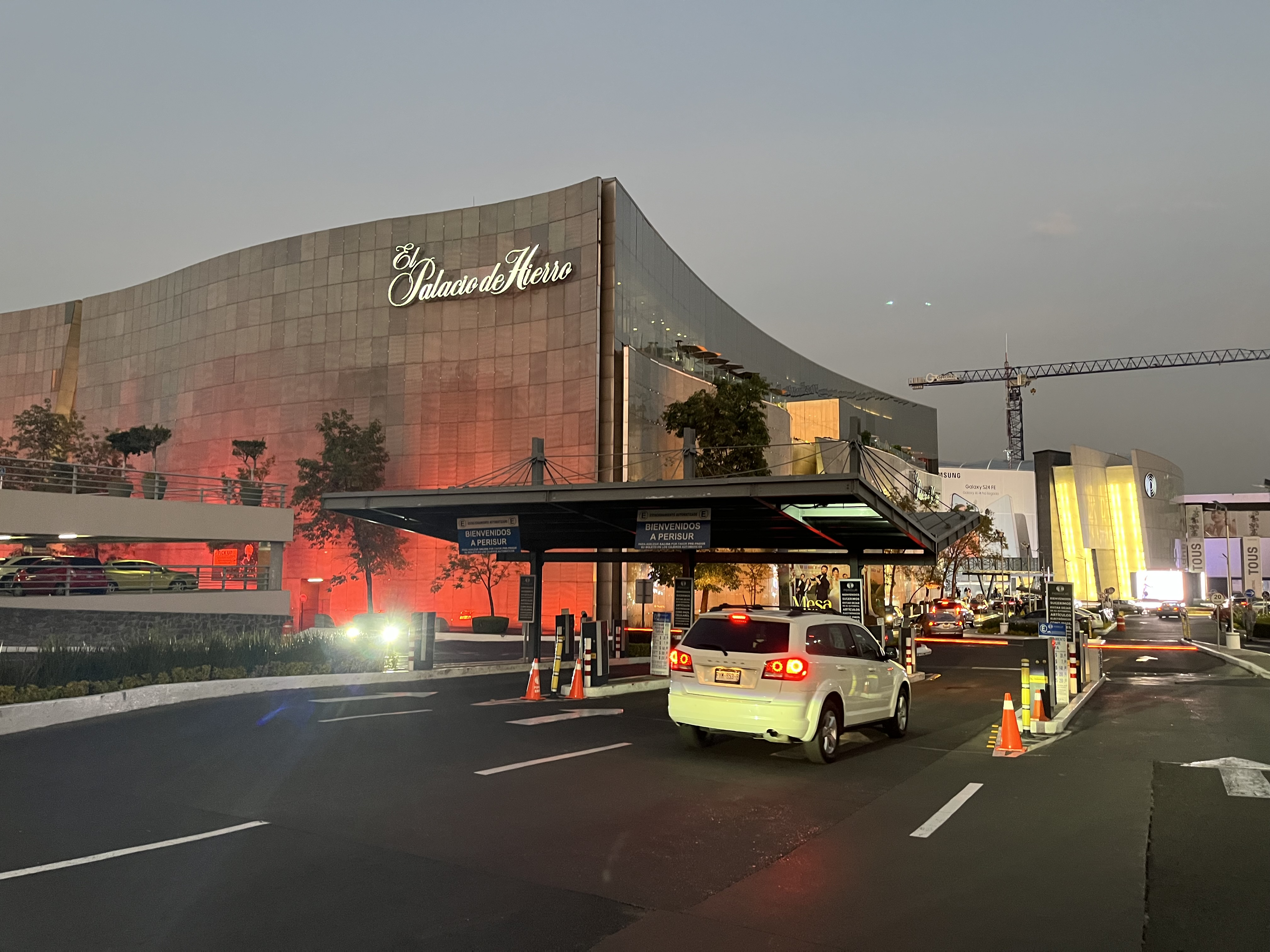
- Outside Perisur
- Location: Pedregal, Mexico City, Mexico
- Coordinates: 19.30422°N 99.18991°W
- Opened: 1980
- Owner: Galerías, El Puerto de Liverpool group
- Num. of stores: 270
- Num. of anchor tenants: 3
- Floor area: 4,800,000 sq ft (450,000 m^{2})
- Floors: 2
- Public transit: Perisur bus station
- Website: perisur.com.mx

Perisur (also Centro Comercial Perisur) is a shopping mall located in the Coyoacán borough in southern Mexico City at the intersection of Insurgentes Avenue South and the Anillo Periférico, next to the UNAM main campus in Ciudad Universitaria and to the upscale Jardines del Pedregal neighbourhood. Designed by architect Juan Sordo Madaleno, the shopping center became the largest shopping mall in total area in Mexico when it opened in 1980. In 2023, the shopping center was the most visited in the county.

== Tenants ==
- Over 230 retail stores
- Over a dozen restaurants
- Over 25 fast food restaurants
- IMAX screen and 19-screen movie theatre Cinépolis.
- Liverpool department store
- El Palacio de Hierro department store
- Sears department store

Former anchors include París-Londres.
