= Centro Coyoacán =

Coordinates: 19.35995°N 99.16895°W

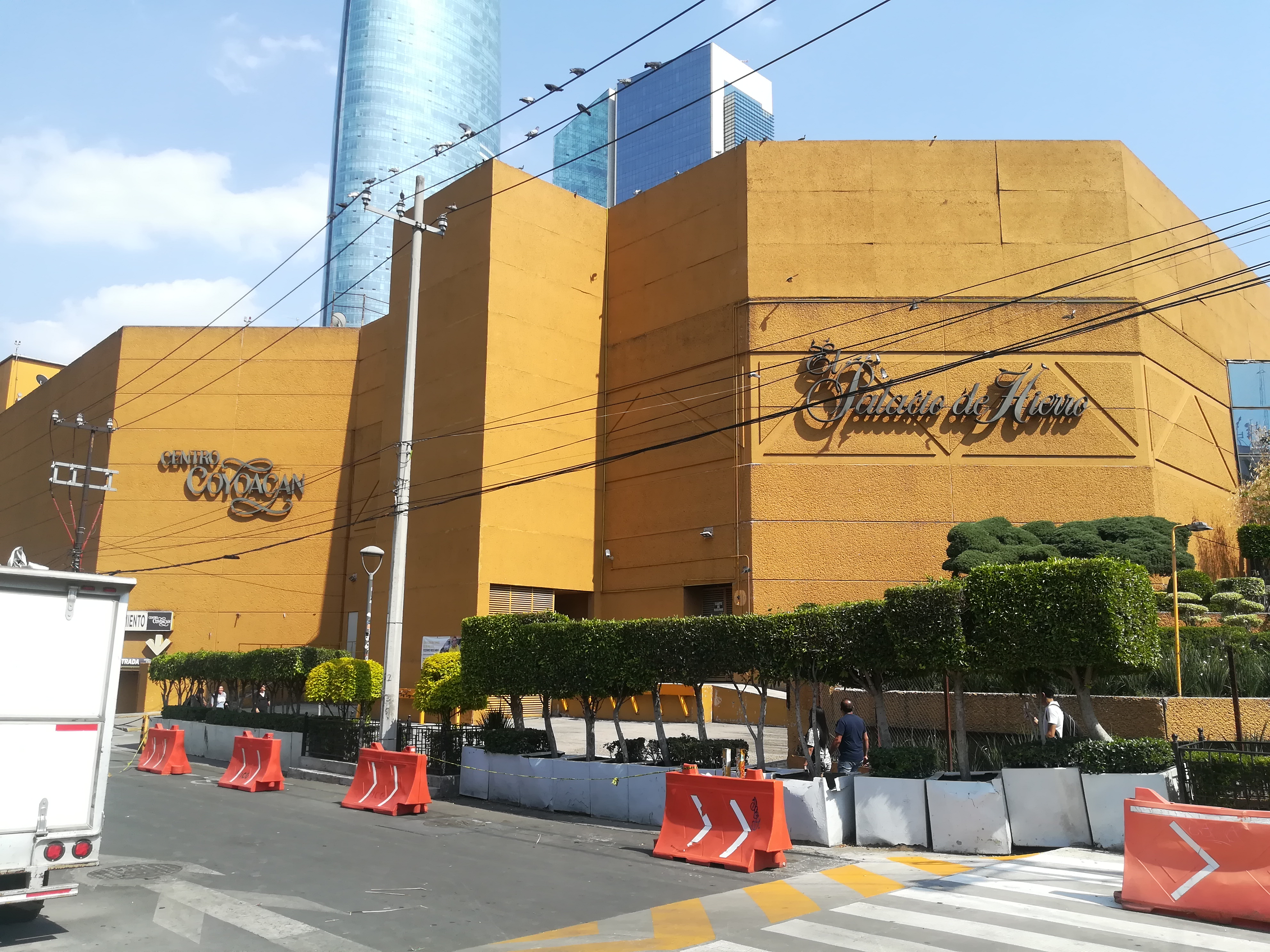

General information
- Location: Mexico City, Mexico, Av. Coyoacán 2000, Col. Xoco, 03330, Mexico City, Mexico
- Opening: 1989
- Closed: 2022
- Owner: El Palacio de Hierro

Technical details
- Floor count: 2
- Floor area: 13,000 m^{2}

Design and construction
- Architect: Javier Sordo Madaleno
- Developer: El Palacio de Hierro

Other information
- Number of stores: 124
- Number of anchors: 2
- Public transit: Coyoacán metro station (at distance)

Website
- www.centrocoyoacan.com.mx

Centro Coyoacán, also known as Centro Comercial Coyoacán, was a shopping mall located on Av. Coyoacán and Av. Universidad in Mexico City, Mexico.

The mall was closed on 19 September 2022 and the area will be incorporated into the adjacent Mítikah mixed-used complex, which includes a shopping center and the largest skyscraper in Mexico City. Mítikah shopping center opened in late 2022 including a new Palacio de Hierro department store, replacing the Centro Coyoacán location.

== Background ==
Renowned architect Javier Sordo Madaleno was appointed to design a unique space to house exclusive stores and an El Palacio de Hierro department store. In 1989, El Palacio de Hierro opened Centro Coyoacán, its first shopping mall.

== See also ==
- Galerías Insurgentes
