= El Puerto de Liverpool =

Mexican retail, financial and real estate company

El Puerto de Liverpool, S.A.B. de C.V.

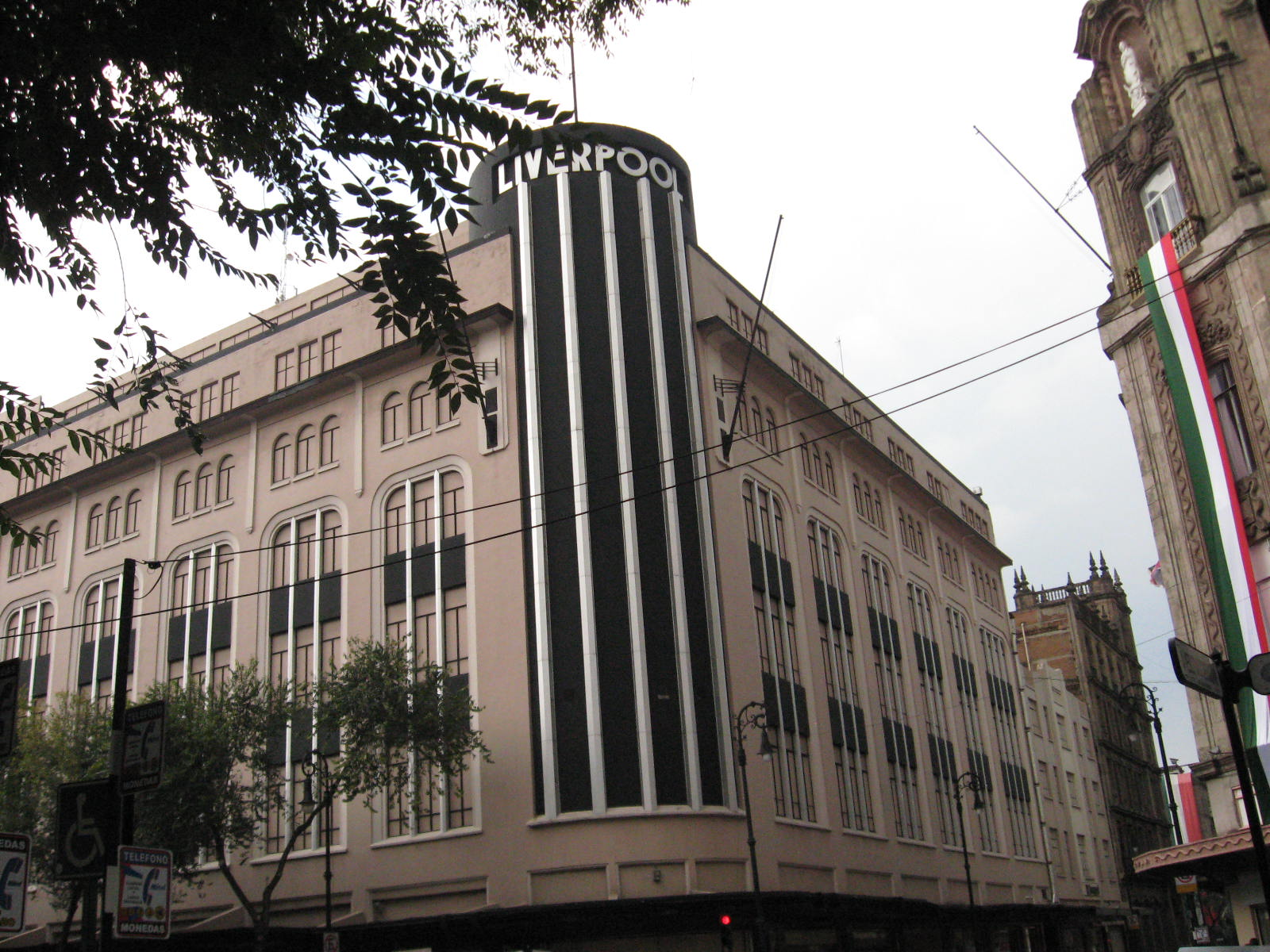
- The original Liverpool store located at Carranza and 20 de Noviembre streets in the historic center of Mexico City.
- Type: Sociedad Anónima Bursátil de Capital Variable
- Traded as: BMV: LIVEPOL
- Industry: Department stores, financial services, shopping centers
- Founded: 1847; 179 years ago
- Founder: Jean Baptiste Ebrard
- Headquarters: Santa Fe, Mexico City, Mexico City, Mexico
- Number of locations: 125 (Liverpool), 195 (Suburbia), 120 fashion brand stores, 30 shopping malls (2025)
- Area served: Mexico
- Key people: Enrique Güijosa (CEO)
- Products: Clothing and accessories, shoes, perfume, cosmetics, jewelry, home furnishings, sporting goods, specialty foods
- Brands: Liverpool, Suburbia, Galerías, franchisee of GAP, Banana Republic, Sfera, Punt Roma, MAC, Kiehl’s, NYX, Urban Decay, Pottery Barn, West Elm, Williams Sonoma
- Services: Revolving credit for retail customers, insurance, rental of stores in malls, in-store services e.g. travel agencies
- Revenue: ▲176,033,720,000 MXN (Mexican pesos, ca. 9.14 billion USD) (2022)
- Operating income: 25,515,379,000 MXN, ca. 1.32 billion USD
- Net income: ▲17,397,239,000 MXN, ca. 903 million USD (2022)
- Total assets: 94,546,550,000 MXN, ca. 4.91 billion USD (2022)
- Number of employees: 76,976 (2022)
- Divisions: commercial/retail, financial, real estate
- Website: elpuertodeliverpool.mx

El Puerto de Liverpool (officially El Puerto de Liverpool, S.A.B. de C.V.) is a Mexican company that consists of commercial, financial, and real estate operations. The commercial area operates the department store chains Liverpool and Suburbia, freestanding retail stores of multiple fashion brands, and the Arco Norte logistics center, under construction. The financial group offers insurance as well as credit to customers of the two department store chains. The real estate group operates shopping malls, all but one (Perisur) branded Galerías.

El Puerto de Liverpool held (as of December 2023) a US$246 million, 9.745% stake in U.S. retailer Nordstrom, and a 50% stake in El Salvador-based Unicomer Group, which operates retail chains in 26 Latin American countries. On December 23, 2024, it was announced that the company plans to increase its stake in Nordstrom to 49.9% as part of the American department store's plans to be taken private. In May 2025, the Nordstrom family and El Puerto de Liverpool finalized an all-cash acquisition of Nordstrom, taking the company private. The Nordstrom family now holds a 50.1% stake, while El Puerto de Liverpool owns the remaining 49.9%.

The Group's headquarters are in Santa Fe, a suburb and a main business center in Mexico City.

== History ==
- 1944 El Puerto de Liverpool group was legally established as a public limited company, S.A. de C.V.
- By 1965 listed on the Mexican Stock Exchange
- 1980: opened the Perisur shopping center and warehouse, the first shopping center the group owns
- 1988: purchases the Fábricas de Francia department store with eight stores
- 1992: opened its second distribution and receiving center: Bodega Tultitlán, with a motor transport network of 135 trucks at that time. It also inaugurates the Galerías Coapa and Galerías Insurgentes shopping centers with their respective warehouses. The systems development center is installed.
- 1997: bought the Comercial Las Galas department store from Tiendas Chedraui, which it converted into Fábricas de Francia stores.
- 1999: bought 11 stores from the Salinas y Rocha appliance store chain
- 2006: changed from a S.A. de C.V. to an S.A.B. de C.V., to comply with the provisions of the Securities Market Law of June 28, 2006
- 2007: partnered with El Corte Inglés group's clothing retailer Sfera to launch dozens of Sfera stores across Mexico
- 2015: partnered with U.S. retailer Williams-Sonoma to bring its brands Williams-Sonoma, Pottery Barn and West Elm to Mexico in stores run by El Puerto de Liverpool group Giving customers the option to purchase goods and services in these boutiques using their cards (DILISA) and (Livertu Universitarios). This association will extend for a period of 10 years.
- August 2016: Liverpool bought the Suburbia department store chain from Walmart Mexico for around 15.7 billion pesos (about $840 million at that time).
- September 2018: announced conversion of 38 of the 41 Fábricas de Francia stores to Liverpool or Suburbia formats, and permanently close the other 3, thus sunsetting the 140-year-old brand.
- 2023: launched Toys "R" Us Mexico]] with WHP Global.
