= Avenida de los Insurgentes =

Street in Mexico City, Mexico

Coordinates: 19.4236°N 99.1629°W

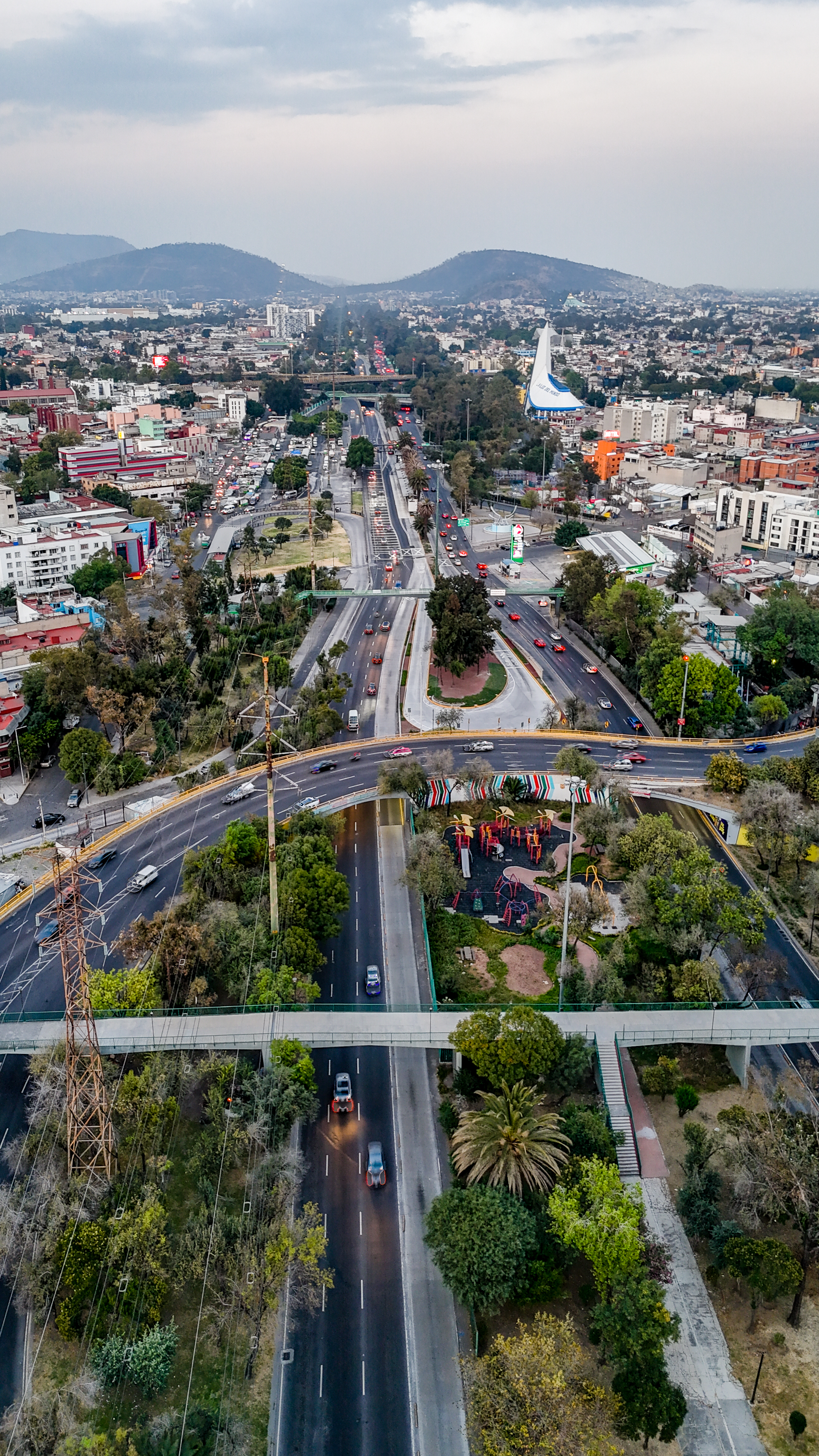
- Insurgentes Norte at La Raza metro station and Circuito Interior

- Former name: Vía del Centenario
- Length: 28.8 km (17.9 mi)
- Location: Mexico City, Mexico
- Nearest metro station: See Notable locations
- North end: Fed. 85D (Mexico-Pachuca Highway)
- Major junctions: Circuito Interior; Paseo de la Reforma; Glorieta de los Insurgentes; Anillo Periférico
- South end: Fed. 95 (Mexico-Cuernavaca Highway)

Avenida de los Insurgentes (lit. 'Avenue of the Insurgents'), usually just called Insurgentes, is the longest avenue in Mexico City, at 28.8 km (17.9 mi). It crosses the city from north to south. The northern end is at Avenida Acueducto de Guadalupe, where it becomes the highway to Pachuca in the state of Hidalgo; the southern end is at Viaducto Tlalpan, where it becomes the highway to Cuernavaca. It was pieced together in the 20th century out of older roads, such as the Camino Nuevo a San Cosme, Avenida Veracruz and the Vía del Centenario.

Insurgentes crosses five of the city's 16 boroughs (Gustavo A. Madero, Cuauhtémoc, Benito Juárez, Coyoacán and Tlalpan) and meets 35 primary and 176 secondary streets on the way. It runs through or past many of the city's best-known colonias (neighborhoods), e.g. Condesa, Roma, Del Valle, Nápoles, San Ángel and Pedregal. Mexico City Metrobús Line 1, the city's first bus rapid transit line, has run along almost the whole avenue since 2005.

== History ==
=== 19th century ===
Its route goes back to the mid-19th century, when it was a string of separate country roads on land that had once been part of Lake Texcoco and Lake Xochimilco. The Nuevo Camino a San Cosme, a wide road, was laid out in 1857 and later replaced by the avenue as the colonias Santa María la Ribera, San Rafael, Tabacalera and Juárez were built around it.

The 1867 plan of the city already shows two stretches of today's Insurgentes. The first was part of the railway to Tacubaya, which had a station at the present corner of Avenida de la República. The second was a road through the Hacienda de la Condesa, on the same line south of Avenida Chapultepec. Over the years the northern stretches were called the Calzada Nueva a Tacubaya, Camino de Hierro a Tacubaya ("iron road", i.e. railway, to Tacubaya), Calzada Particular del Ferrocarril del Distrito, Calle Sur 22 and Calle Ramón Guzmán, among other names. The official city plan of 1900 shows the part that crossed Paseo de la Reforma as Ramón Guzmán, later the "Camino Particular de los Ferrocarriles del Distrito".

=== Avenida Veracruz and the road to San Ángel ===
When the Hacienda de la Condesa was subdivided in 1902, the hacienda road became Avenida Veracruz, the dividing line between the new colonias Roma and Condesa. It ran from Avenida Chapultepec to Avenida Jalisco (now Avenida Álvaro Obregón) and got its name under the nationalist street-naming scheme the two developers had agreed on. It was 30 metres (98 ft) wide, with a median and big houses on both sides. The journalist Pascual Salanueva dated its start to February 1903, when the city council signed a contract with the Colonia de la Condesa company to develop the colonia. Its first extension went south to the Río de la Piedad, now the Viaducto Miguel Alemán.

In January 1922 El Universal announced that the "calzada" de los Insurgentes would be extended in a straight line to San Ángel, across Roma and Del Valle. The 8-kilometre (5.0 mi) stretch would be wide, tree-lined, paved and well lit, and was supposed to bring visitors out to Mixcoac. Until then the avenue only ran from Reforma to the Río de la Piedad. Some 42,000 square metres (450,000 sq ft) of road were paved. President Álvaro Obregón, who lived in Colonia Roma, opened the new stretch, at first called the Calzada Nueva, on 2 November 1924. He drove from Roma to San Ángel in eight minutes. Its narrow median followed the American model, then new in the city. In San Ángel the road cut straight through the orchards of the Carmelite convent, with no regard for the old street plan. By 1929 it ended at Avenida de la Paz.

A roundabout where the Colonia del Valle tram turned around was finished in 1927 (not the present Glorieta de los Insurgentes). By 1932 El Universal Ilustrado called Insurgentes one of the most important roads in the capital. The 1933 city plan did away with the names Avenida Veracruz, Antiguo Camino a Cuernavaca and Vía del Centenario. Salanueva wrote that Insurgentes started out as a street for the new rich who had done well out of the Revolution, and that its northern end later linked the upscale houses of Lindavista with the rest of the city. The first Sears store in Mexico opened at the corner of San Luis Potosí on 27 February 1947.

=== Name ===
The avenue was named after the insurgents who fought for Mexican independence from Spain in the Mexican War of Independence (1810–1821). When the name was first used is not clear. El Universal found news items and ads from 1916 on that called at least parts of the road "Insurgentes". José Antonio Suárez, a Colonia Roma resident and amateur historian, told the paper in 2001 that a stretch was renamed in 1921 during the preparations for the centenary of independence, because it was the closest Miguel Hidalgo had come to entering Mexico City. The Secretariat of Communications and Transport thinks the name may come from the Puente de los Insurgentes, a bridge built in the early 19th century where Insurgentes metro station is now. It is in President Obregón's reports of 1922–1923. In the 1940s the avenue was officially named Avenida del Ejército Insurgente ("Avenue of the Insurgent Army"), but people kept calling it Insurgentes.

=== Insurgentes Norte and Ciudad Universitaria ===
Insurgentes Norte was once the start of the highway to Laredo. The Monumento a la Raza, a 50-metre (160 ft) pyramid by the engineer Francisco Borbolla and the architect Luis Lelo de Larrea, opened in the median on 12 October 1940, the Día de la Raza. In 1946 the avenue was extended north to the exit to Pachuca. In the 1950s the Indios Verdes statues stood on the old Laredo highway, their third location.

Insurgentes became the main road to Ciudad Universitaria, built in the late 1940s and early 1950s. The project, run by the architect Carlos Lazo, built some of the first grade-separated crossings in the city, to keep pedestrians away from car traffic. Later the avenue was extended south past the Periférico and Cuicuilco, through Tlalpan, to the highway to Cuernavaca.

North of Reforma, the 1955 Guía Flecha street guide still used the old names Ramón Guzmán, Mejía and Olivo; around 1960 the avenue's route looked much like it does today. Mario Pani planned a new city centre at the crossing of Insurgentes and Reforma. Only his Hotel Plaza (1945), at the corner of Sullivan, got built.

=== 1960s to 1990s ===
For the 1968 Summer Olympics the Teatro de los Insurgentes held the weightlifting events, and the Pista de Hielo Insurgentes, an ice rink where the Plaza Inn mall is now, held the wrestling.

The present Glorieta de los Insurgentes, a sunken roundabout over Insurgentes station of Metro Line 1, opened in 1969. The front of the Cine Insurgentes was cut back to make room for it. El Universal calls the Glorieta the biggest change the avenue has seen. Trams ran both ways on Insurgentes through Colonia Roma into the 1970s; a 1972 photo shows one heading north at the corner of Tuxpan.

In the 1970s and '80s the avenue was known for its Vips coffee shops, the Tomboy hamburger restaurant near Parque Hundido, the Hip 70 record shop and disco, the panoramic restaurant at the top of the Hotel de México (now the World Trade Center) and the fountain at the Liverpool department store at Félix Cuevas.

The 1985 earthquake damaged many buildings on the avenue in Colonia Roma; the building with the big Corona sign at the corner of Durango was lost. Insurgentes 300 (1958), which had already come through the 1957 earthquake, was left mostly empty.

=== 21st century ===
Until the Metrobús came, the median had shrubs and flowers in places. Metrobús Line 1 opened on 19 June 2005 from Indios Verdes to Doctor Gálvez, in San Ángel. On 13 March 2008 Head of Government Marcelo Ebrard opened the extension from Doctor Gálvez to El Caminero, with ten more stations. In March 2010 Insurgentes was closed for a month between Reforma and Álvaro Obregón to relevel the road through the Glorieta, where the Metrobús lane had sunk unevenly by up to 4 metres (13 ft).

In 2017 Excélsior counted 28 building projects under construction on Insurgentes Sur, from the 28-storey Torre Glorieta at the Glorieta de los Insurgentes to the 25-storey Torre Aleph in San Ángel. There were six around the World Trade Center, eight in Guadalupe Inn and several between Parque Hundido and the Torre Manacar.

On 31 May 2020, during the COVID-19 pandemic, the city opened an emergency bike lane next to the Metrobús lanes from San Simón to Villa Olímpica, 20 kilometres (12 mi) each way. In an August 2020 survey 95% of its users, 73% of Metrobús riders and 54% of shopkeepers and drivers on the avenue wanted it to stay. It was made permanent, and Head of Government Claudia Sheinbaum opened the Ciclovía Insurgentes, from San Simón to Eje 10 Sur (14.25 kilometres (8.85 mi) each way), on 20 February 2022.

== Notable locations ==
Legally the avenue is three streets. Avenida de los Insurgentes Norte runs from Avenida Acueducto de Guadalupe south to Ribera de San Cosme, and is numbered from south to north. Avenida de los Insurgentes Centro runs from Ribera de San Cosme to Paseo de la Reforma. Avenida de los Insurgentes Sur runs from Reforma to the Monumento al Caminero in Tlalpan. Centro and Sur are numbered from north to south.

Locations are listed from north to south, with the colonias (neighborhoods) on each side of the avenue. Metro and Metrobús stations, government offices and other minor locations are in small type.

MB = Metrobús line; M = Metro line

=== Insurgentes Norte ===
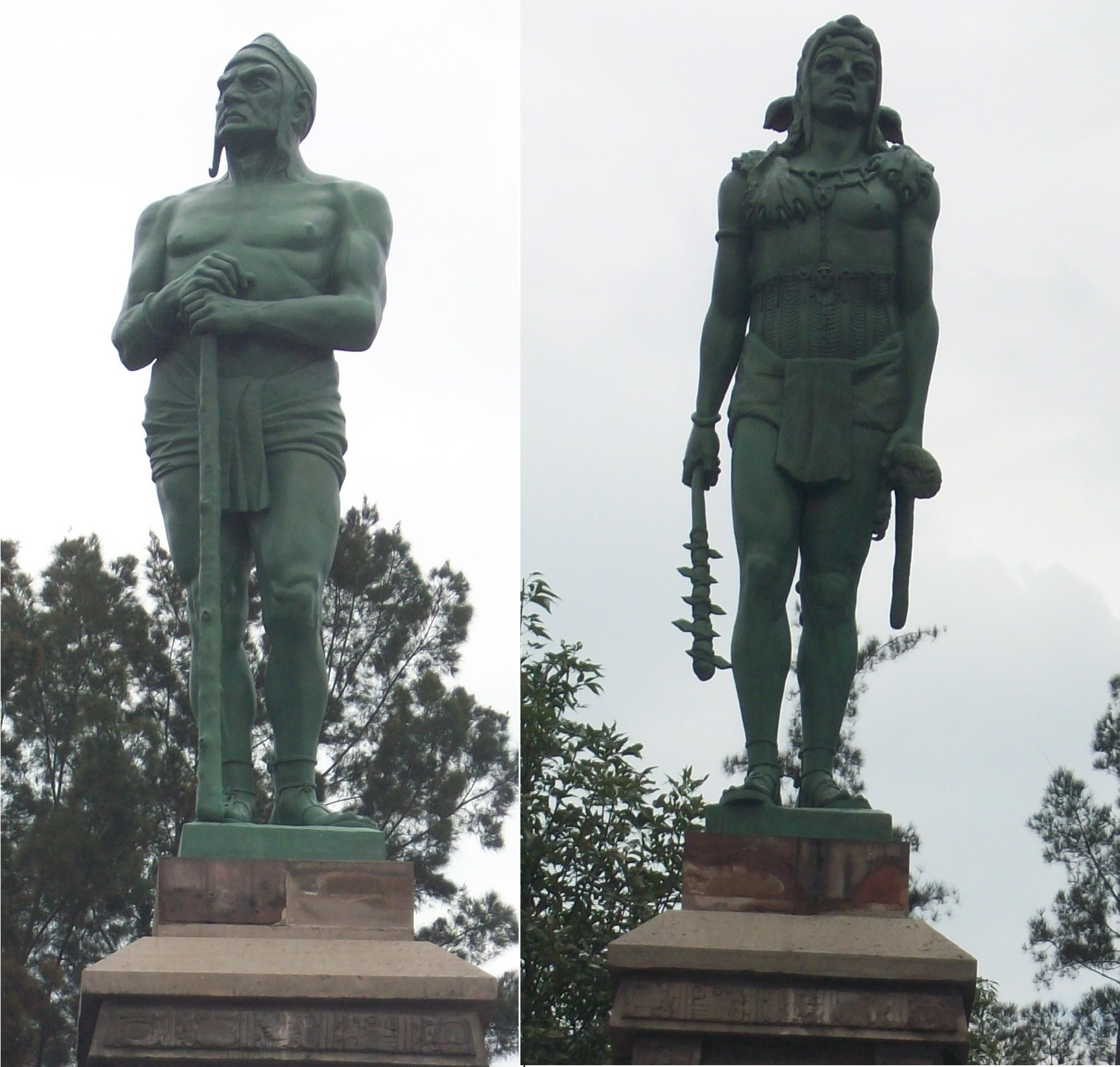
Monumento a los Indios Verdes, Insurgentes Norte at Indios Verdes

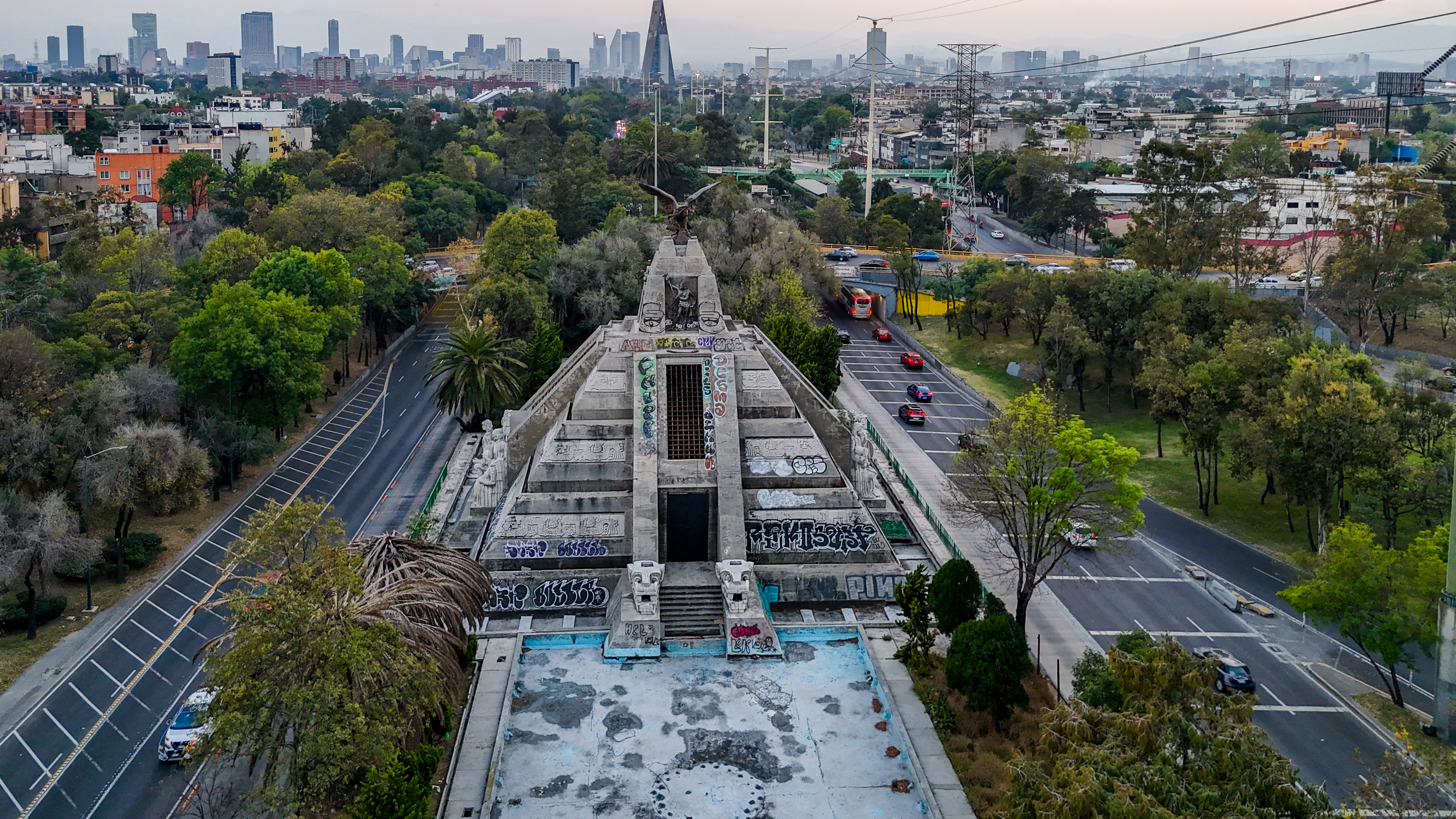
Insurgentes Norte at the Monumento a la Raza

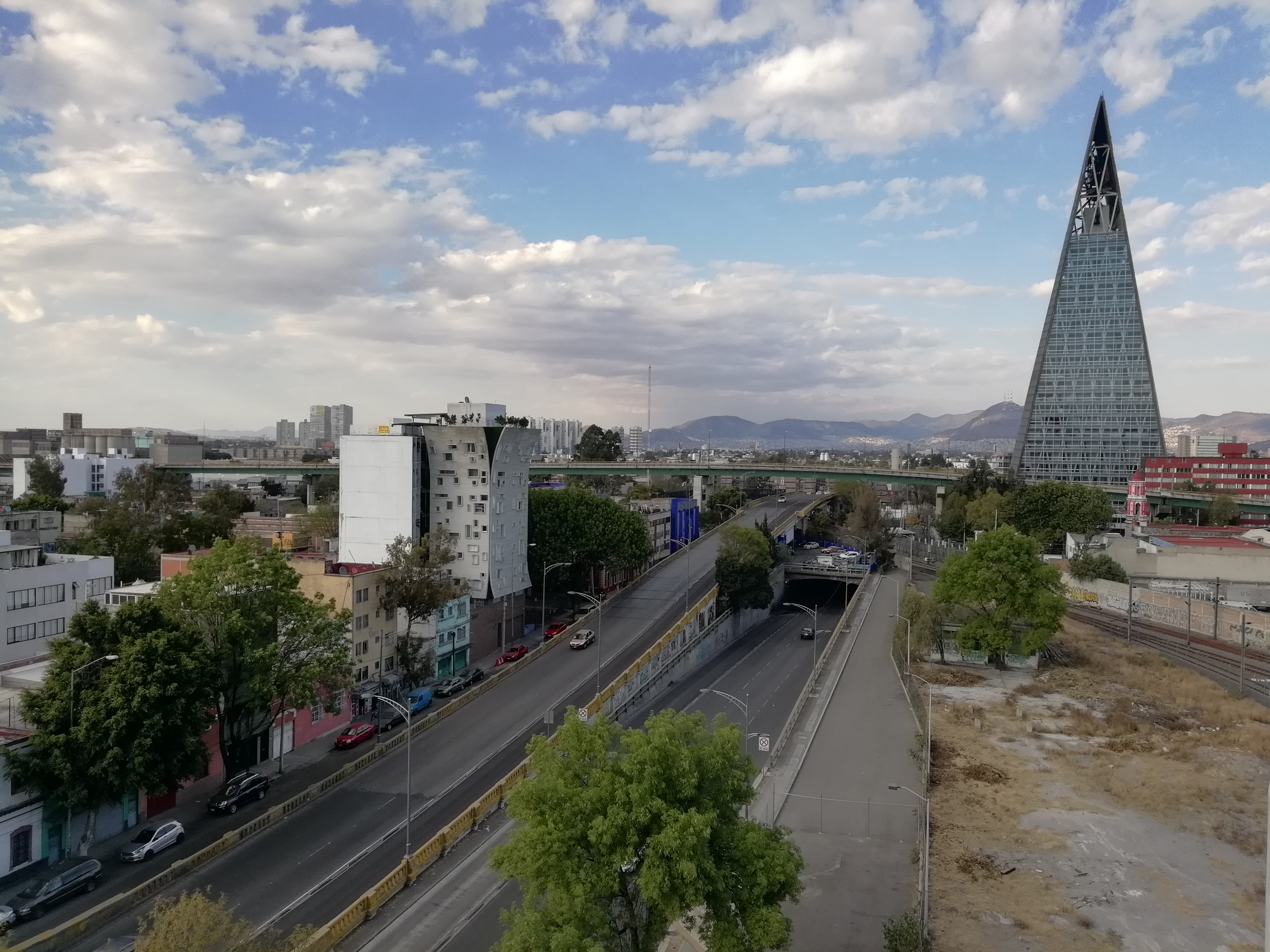
Avenida de los Insurgentes and the Torre Insignia, Insurgentes Norte s/n, at Ricardo Flores Magón

Colonia on western side	No.	Side	Location	Colonia on eastern side
Residencial Zacatenco			Northern end of the avenue, at Avenida Acueducto de Guadalupe, named after the 18th-century Acueducto de Guadalupe. North of here the road continues as the highway to Pachuca.	Santa Isabel Tola
Residencial Zacatenco			Indios Verdes MB, northern terminus of Metrobús Line 1; Indios Verdes M, northern terminus of Metro Line 3; also served by Mexibús Line 4, Cablebús Line 1 and Mexicable Line 2	Santa Isabel Tola
Lindavista Norte		E	Monumento a los Indios Verdes, statues of the tlatoque Ahuitzotl and Itzcoatl by Alejandro Casarín (1891), now in the Parque del Mestizaje	Santa Isabel Tola
Lindavista Sur			Deportivo 18 de Marzo MB; Deportivo 18 de Marzo M	Tepeyac Insurgentes
Lindavista Sur	1698	W	Escuela Nacional Preparatoria 9 (Preparatoria 9), a high school of the UNAM	Tepeyac Insurgentes
Magdalena de las Salinas			Euzkaro MB	Industrial
Capultitlán			Potrero MB; Potrero M	Guadalupe Insurgentes
Vallejo Poniente			La Raza MB; La Raza M; La Raza station of Mexibús Line 4	Vallejo
Santa María Insurgentes		median	Monumento a la Raza, a 50 m (160 ft) pyramid in the middle of the interchange with the Circuito Interior and Calzada Vallejo	Peralvillo
Santa María Insurgentes			Circuito MB	San Simón Tolnáhuac
Santa María Insurgentes			San Simón MB	San Simón Tolnáhuac
Atlampa			Manuel González MB	Nonoalco Tlatelolco
Atlampa		E	Conjunto Urbano Nonoalco Tlatelolco	Nonoalco Tlatelolco
Atlampa	at Ricardo Flores Magón	E	Torre Insignia (1962), also called Torre Banobras, by Mario Pani	Nonoalco Tlatelolco
Santa María la Ribera	at Eje 1 Norte (Mosqueta)	E	Buenavista railway station, terminus of the Tren Suburbano commuter rail, with the Forum Buenavista shopping mall (2009) built on top; the site of the old Buenavista station (1873–2005)	Buenavista
Santa María la Ribera			Buenavista MB; Buenavista M	Buenavista
Santa María la Ribera			El Chopo MB	Buenavista

=== Insurgentes Centro ===
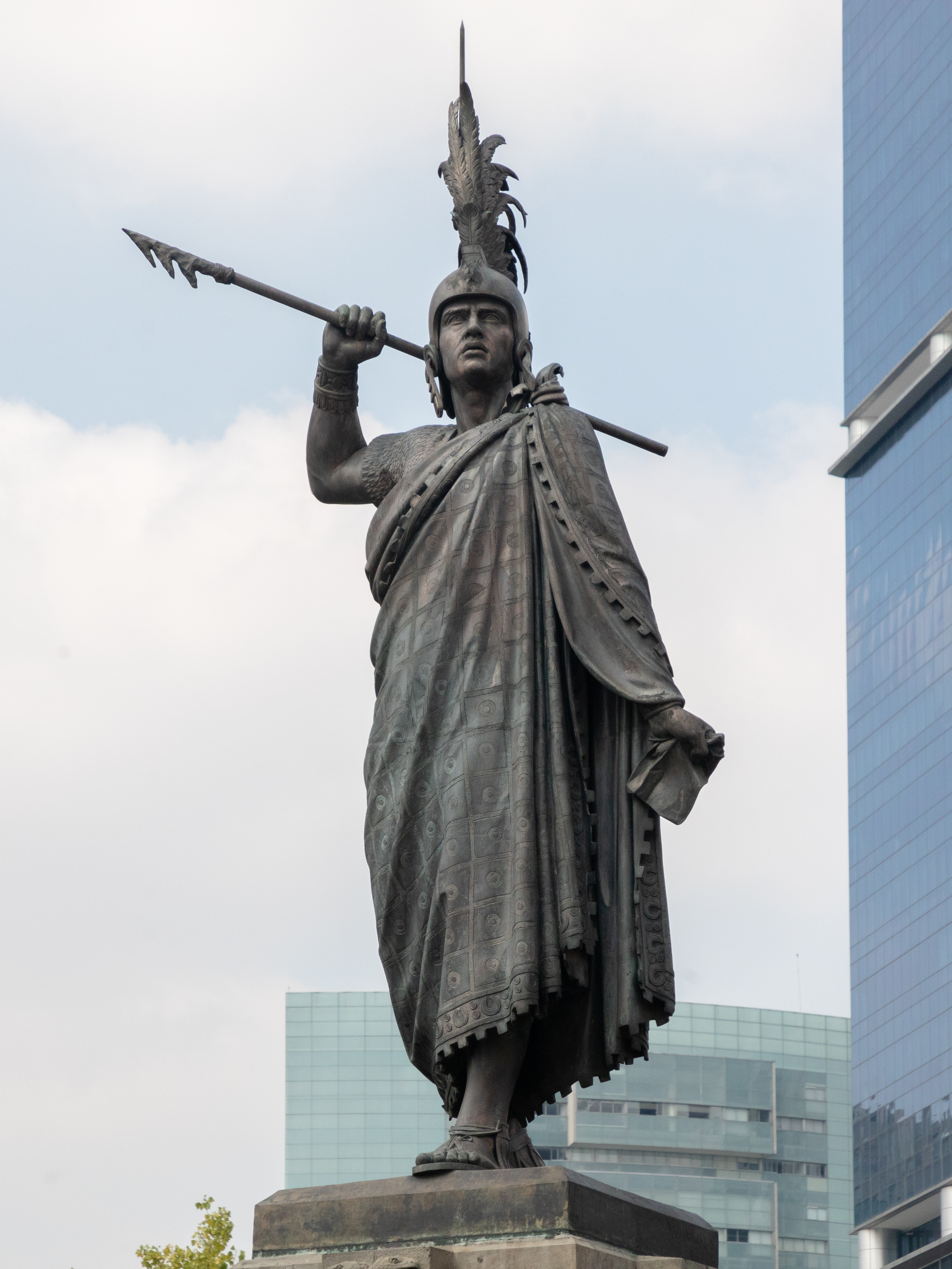
Monument to Cuauhtémoc, Insurgentes Centro at Reforma

Colonia on western side	No.	Side	Location	Colonia on eastern side
Santa María la Ribera	at Ribera de San Cosme		Revolución MB; Revolución M	Buenavista
San Rafael			Plaza de la República MB (formerly Tabacalera)	Tabacalera
San Rafael	at James Sullivan	W	Monumento a la Madre (1949), destroyed in the 2017 earthquake and reopened in 2018	Tabacalera
San Rafael			Reforma MB	Tabacalera
San Rafael	at Reforma	E	Headquarters of the Senate of the Republic, at Paseo de la Reforma 135	Tabacalera
Cuauhtémoc	at Reforma	median	Monument to Cuauhtémoc (1887), at the junction with Paseo de la Reforma	Tabacalera

=== Insurgentes Sur ===
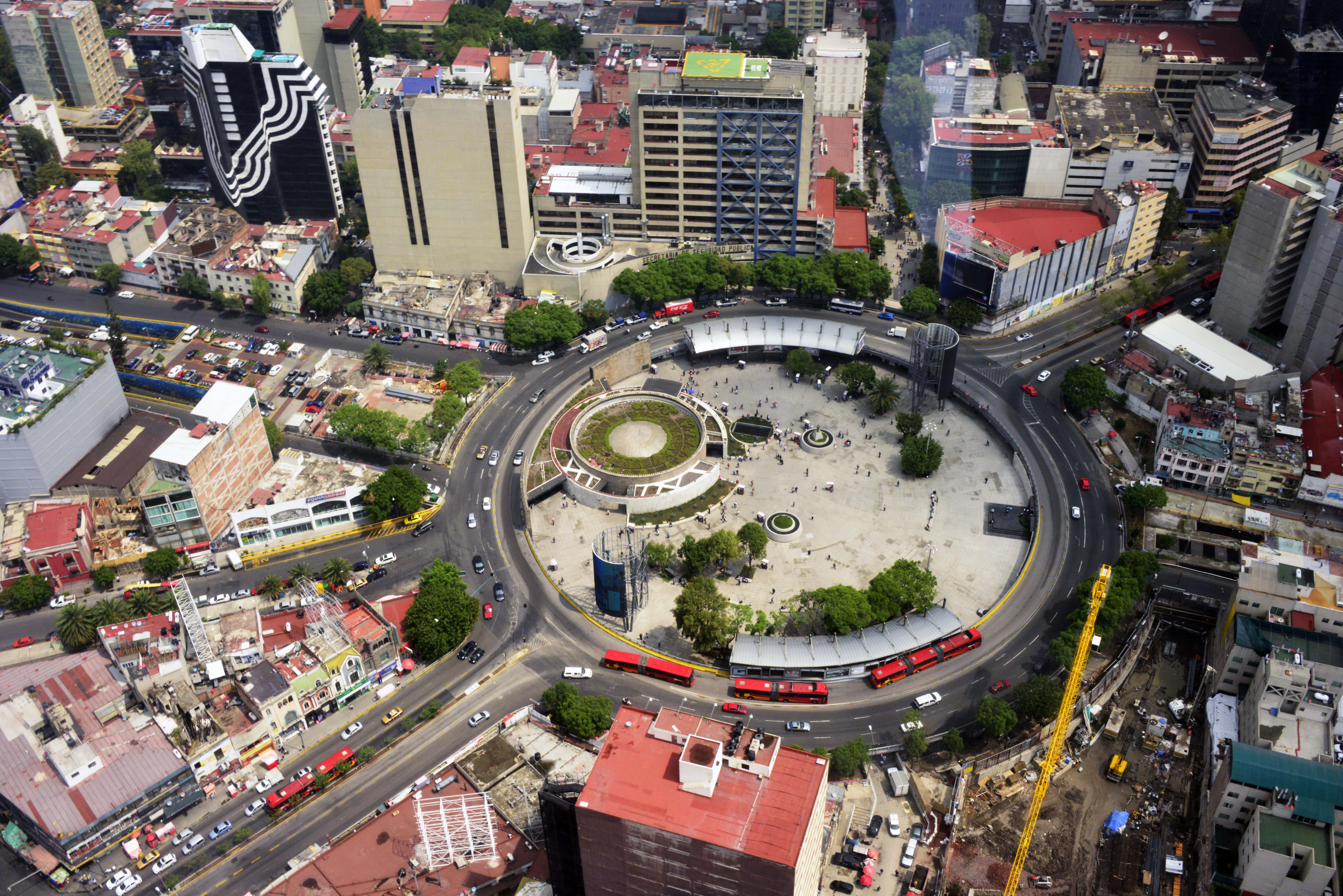
Glorieta de los Insurgentes, Insurgentes Sur at Chapultepec

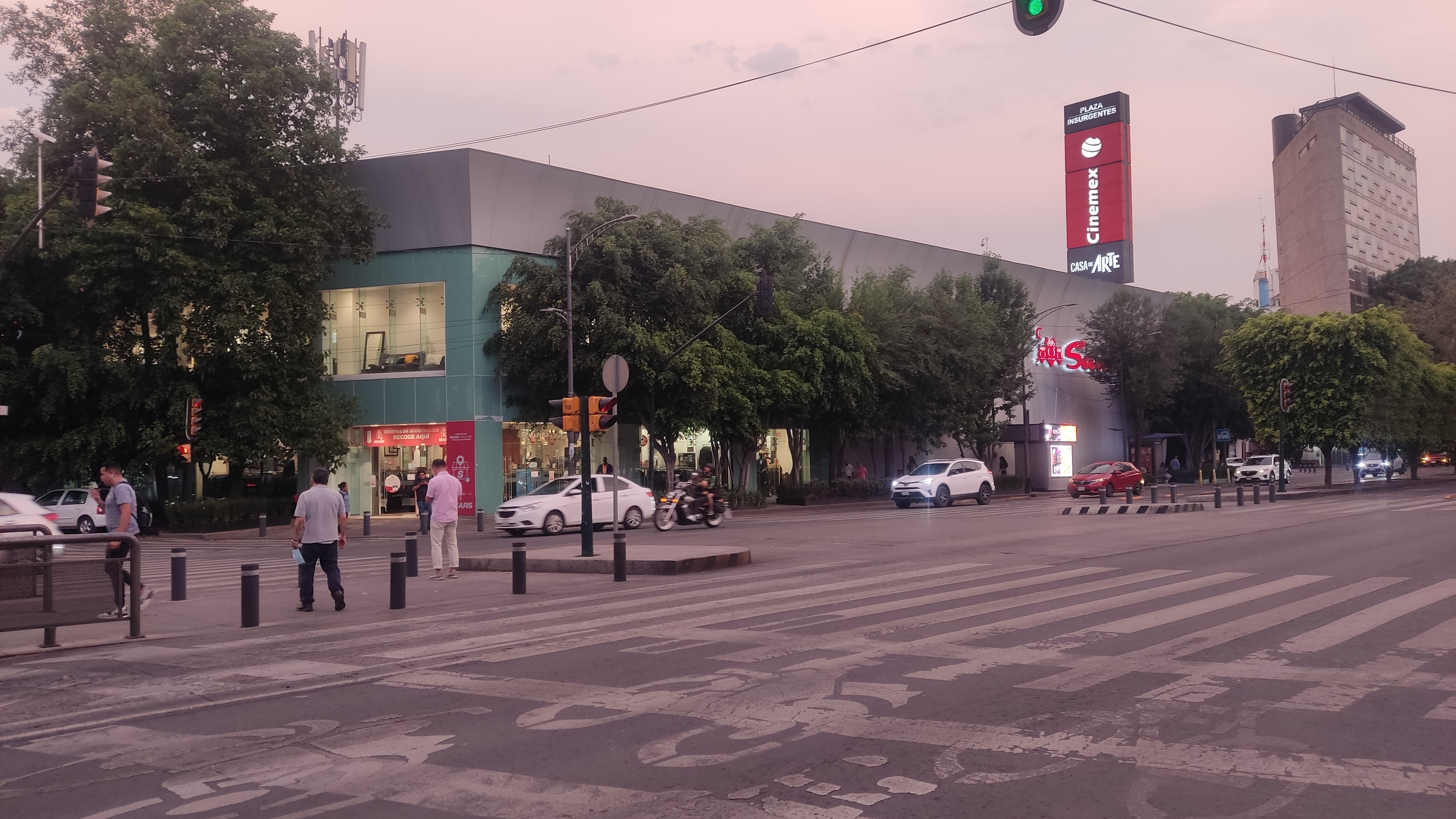
Plaza Insurgentes, San Luis Potosí 214, at Insurgentes Sur

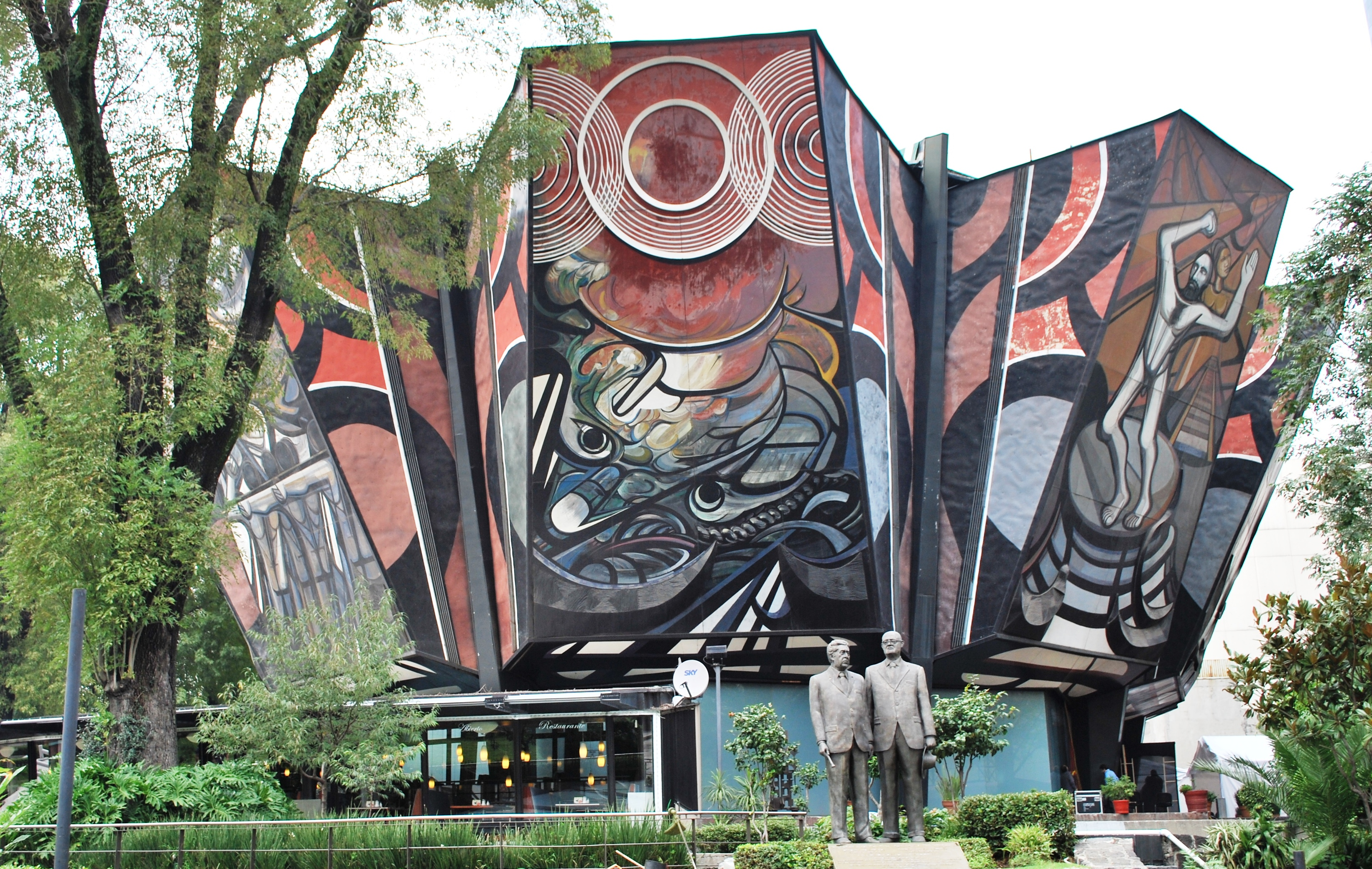
Polyforum Cultural Siqueiros, at #701 Sur

Teatro de los Insurgentes (2025), at #1587 Sur

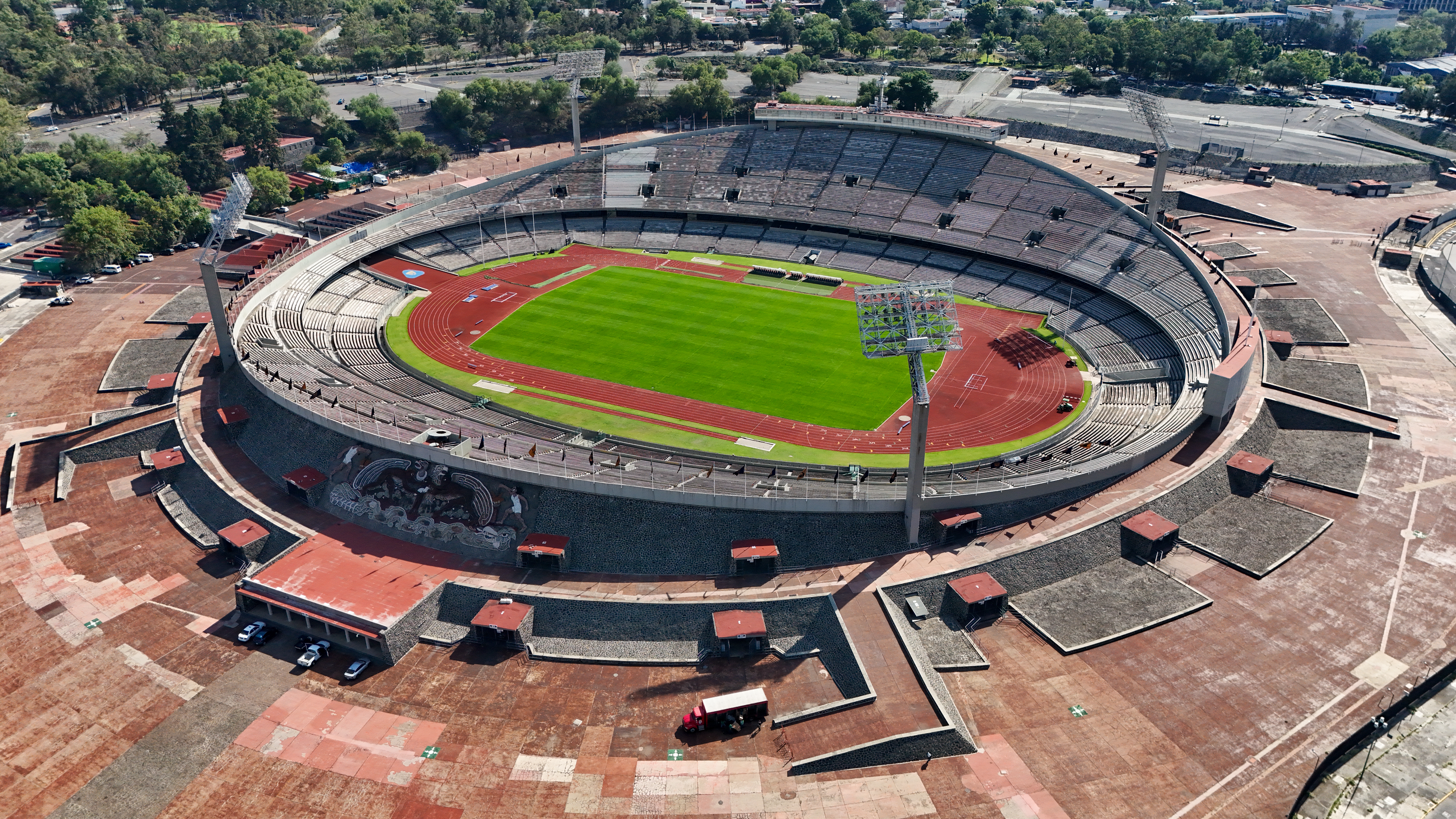
Estadio Olímpico Universitario, Insurgentes Sur s/n, Ciudad Universitaria

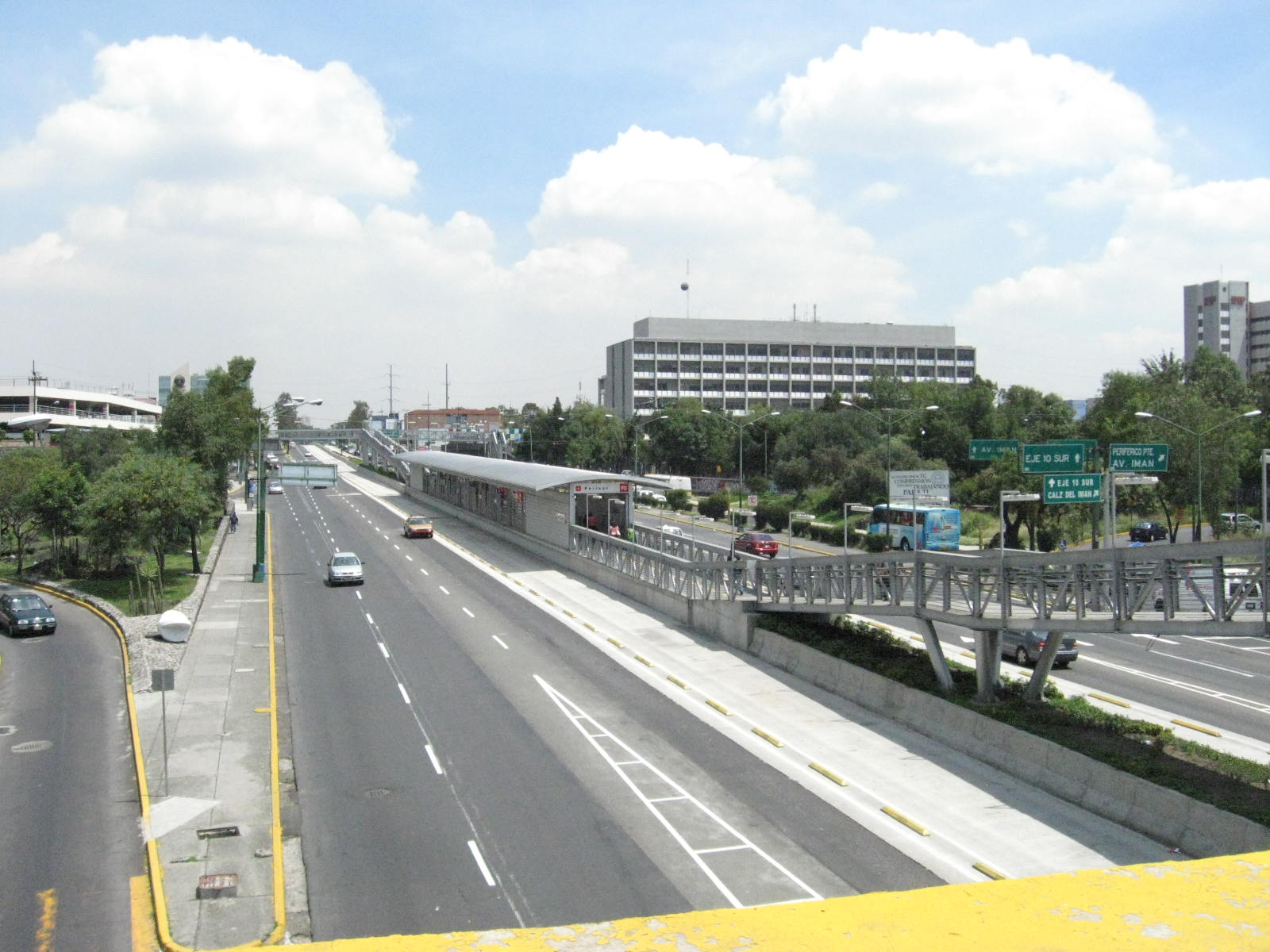
Southern section of Avenida Insurgentes, taken from a bridge of the Periférico, near the Perisur Mall (Periférico Sur 4690). Shows Metrobús station Perisur

Colonia on western side	No.	Side	Location	Colonia on eastern side
Juárez (Zona Rosa)	at Reforma	W	Torre Punta Reforma (2015)	Juárez
Juárez (Zona Rosa)	at Reforma	W	Reforma 222, towers and shopping mall by Teodoro González de León (2007)	Juárez
Juárez (Zona Rosa)			Hamburgo MB	Juárez
Juárez (Zona Rosa)	at Avenida Chapultepec	median	Glorieta de los Insurgentes. The statue El Sereno (1992) and the Centro Cultural Xavier Villaurrutia are in the roundabout	Juárez
Juárez (Zona Rosa)			Glorieta de los Insurgentes MB; Insurgentes M	Roma Norte
Roma Norte			Durango MB	Roma Norte
Roma Norte			Álvaro Obregón MB	Roma Norte
Hipódromo	300	E	Insurgentes 300, also called Condominio Insurgentes. Designed by Mario Pani	Roma Norte
Hipódromo			Sonora MB	Roma Norte
Hipódromo	at San Luis Potosí	E	Plaza Insurgentes, built around the first Sears in Mexico (1947)	Roma Norte
Hipódromo			Campeche MB	Roma Sur
Hipódromo	421	W	Offices of the Instituto Nacional de Antropología e Historia (INAH)	Roma Sur
Hipódromo	421	W	Andaz Mexico City Condesa (2023), a 213-room hotel in the I421 complex, the former Conjunto Aristos (1961) by the architect José Luis Benlliure López de Arana	Roma Sur
Hipódromo	453	W	Cine Las Américas, cinema built in 1953 by José Villagrán García, now the Auditorio BB	Roma Sur
Hipódromo			Chilpancingo MB; Chilpancingo M	Roma Sur
Hipódromo	489	W	SENASICA	Roma Sur
Hipódromo			Nuevo León MB	Roma Sur
Nápoles			La Piedad MB	Del Valle Norte
Nápoles	at Filadelfia	W	World Trade Center Mexico City, the former Hotel de México	Del Valle Norte
Nápoles			Poliforum MB	Del Valle Norte
Nápoles	701	W	Polyforum Cultural Siqueiros (1971), with murals by David Alfaro Siqueiros	Del Valle Norte
Nápoles	710	E	Novotel Mexico City World Trade Center (2022), 106 rooms	Del Valle Norte
Nápoles	724	E	Hyatt Regency Mexico City Insurgentes (2023), 201 rooms	Del Valle Norte
Nápoles	762	E	CONDUSEF	Del Valle Norte
Nápoles	810	E	CONEVAL	Del Valle Centro
Ampliación Nápoles			Nápoles MB	Del Valle Centro
Ampliación Nápoles	881	W	Federal Court of Administrative Justice	Del Valle Centro
Ampliación Nápoles	890	E	Secretariat of Energy (SENER)	Del Valle Centro
Ciudad de los Deportes			Colonia del Valle MB	Insurgentes San Borja
Ciudad de los Deportes	954	E	PRODECON	Insurgentes San Borja
Noche Buena			Ciudad de los Deportes MB	Insurgentes San Borja
Noche Buena	1089	W	Secretariat of Infrastructure, Communications and Transportation (SICT)	Insurgentes San Borja
Noche Buena	1143	W	Federal Telecommunications Institute (IFT)	Insurgentes San Borja
Extremadura Insurgentes			Parque Hundido MB	Tlacoquemécatl
Extremadura Insurgentes		W	Parque Hundido (officially Parque Luis G. Urbina)	Tlacoquemécatl
Insurgentes Mixcoac	at Félix Cuevas		Félix Cuevas MB; Insurgentes Sur M	Tlacoquemécatl
Insurgentes Mixcoac	at Parroquia	E	Galerías Insurgentes	Actipan
Insurgentes Mixcoac	1457	W	Manacar, built where the Cine Manacar (1965–2013) used to be	Actipan
Insurgentes Mixcoac			Río Churubusco MB	Actipan
San José Insurgentes			Teatro Insurgentes MB	Crédito Constructor
San José Insurgentes	1582	E	Headquarters of the Secretariat of Science, Humanities, Technology and Innovation, formerly the Conahcyt	Crédito Constructor
San José Insurgentes	1587	W	Teatro de los Insurgentes (1953), with a Diego Rivera mural on the façade	Crédito Constructor
Guadalupe Inn			José María Velasco MB	Florida
Guadalupe Inn	1735	W	Secretariat of Anticorruption and Good Governance	Florida
Guadalupe Inn			Francia MB	Florida
Guadalupe Inn			Olivo MB	Florida
Guadalupe Inn	1940	E	Secretariat of Economy	Florida
Guadalupe Inn			Altavista MB	Ex-Hacienda de Guadalupe Chimalistac
San Ángel	at Avenida de la Paz	E	Parque de la Bombilla and the monument to Álvaro Obregón	Chimalistac
San Ángel			La Bombilla MB	Chimalistac
San Ángel		W	Historic center of San Ángel	Chimalistac
Barrio Loreto			Dr. Gálvez MB	Chimalistac
La Otra Banda	2416	E	National Water Commission (CONAGUA)	Copilco El Bajo
Ciudad Universitaria	3000	both	Ciudad Universitaria, the main campus of the UNAM and a World Heritage Site	Ciudad Universitaria
Ciudad Universitaria		W	Estadio Olímpico Universitario (1952), with the Diego Rivera relief La universidad, la familia y el deporte en México	Ciudad Universitaria
Ciudad Universitaria			Ciudad Universitaria MB	Ciudad Universitaria
Ciudad Universitaria			Centro Cultural Universitario MB	Ciudad Universitaria
Ciudad Universitaria	3000	E	Centro Cultural Universitario, including the Museo Universitario Arte Contemporáneo (MUAC, 2008)	Ciudad Universitaria
Insurgentes Cuicuilco	3700	E	Instituto Nacional de Pediatría	Insurgentes Cuicuilco
Insurgentes Cuicuilco	at Periférico	W	Perisur (1980)	Insurgentes Cuicuilco
Insurgentes Cuicuilco			Perisur MB	Insurgentes Cuicuilco
Insurgentes Cuicuilco	at Periférico		Ruta de la Amistad sculptures (1968) along the Periférico	Insurgentes Cuicuilco
Villa Olímpica	at Periférico	W	Comisión Nacional para el Conocimiento y Uso de la Biodiversidad (CONABIO)	Peña Pobre
Villa Olímpica		E	Cuicuilco	Peña Pobre
Villa Olímpica		W	Villa Olímpica (1968)	Peña Pobre
Villa Olímpica			Villa Olímpica MB	Peña Pobre
Villa Olímpica	at San Fernando	E	Loreto y Peña Pobre Ecological Park, on the site of the Loreto y Peña Pobre paper mill	Peña Pobre
Barrio La Lonja			Corregidora MB	Tlalpan
Barrio La Fama			Ayuntamiento MB	Tlalpan
Barrio La Fama	3877	W	Instituto Nacional de Neurología y Neurocirugía	Tlalpan
Barrio La Fama		E	Monumento al perro callejero (2008)	Tlalpan
Fuentes Brotantes			Fuentes Brotantes MB, for the Fuentes Brotantes de Tlalpan National Park	Tlalpan Centro
Santa Úrsula Xitla	4003	W	Restaurante Arroyo, with seating for 2,200	Tlalpan Centro
Santa Úrsula Xitla			Santa Úrsula MB	Tlalpan Centro
Santa Úrsula Xitla	4303	W	Universidad Intercontinental	Tlalpan Centro
Santa Úrsula Xitla			La Joya MB	Tlalpan Centro
Santa Úrsula Xitla			El Caminero MB, southern terminus of Metrobús Line 1	Tlalpan Centro
Chimalcóyotl		median	Monumento al Caminero, at the junction with the highway to Cuernavaca; southern end of the avenue	Villa Tlalpan

Insurgentes crosses many of the city's ejes viales, the Circuito Interior twice (at La Raza and at Río Mixcoac) and the Anillo Periférico once, near Perisur.

== Public transportation ==
Mexico City Metrobús Line 1 runs in the center lanes of the avenue for 28.1 km (17.5 mi), almost its whole length, from Indios Verdes to El Caminero. As of 2024 the line had 44 stations and carried about 530,000 passengers a day. Its stations, and the Metro stations on or next to the avenue, are in the Notable locations tables.

Before the Metrobús there were only buses and microbuses. SETRAVI, the city's transport department, counted about 192,000 passengers a day on 109 buses and 200 microbuses, grouped in 12 routes between Indios Verdes and La Joya.
