= El Sereno =

El Sereno may refer to:

- El Sereno, Los Angeles, California, United States
- El Sereno Open Space Preserve, California, United States
- El Sereno (sculpture), in Mexico City
- Monte Sereno, California, United States

== See also ==
- Sereno (disambiguation)
