= Bell of Dolores =

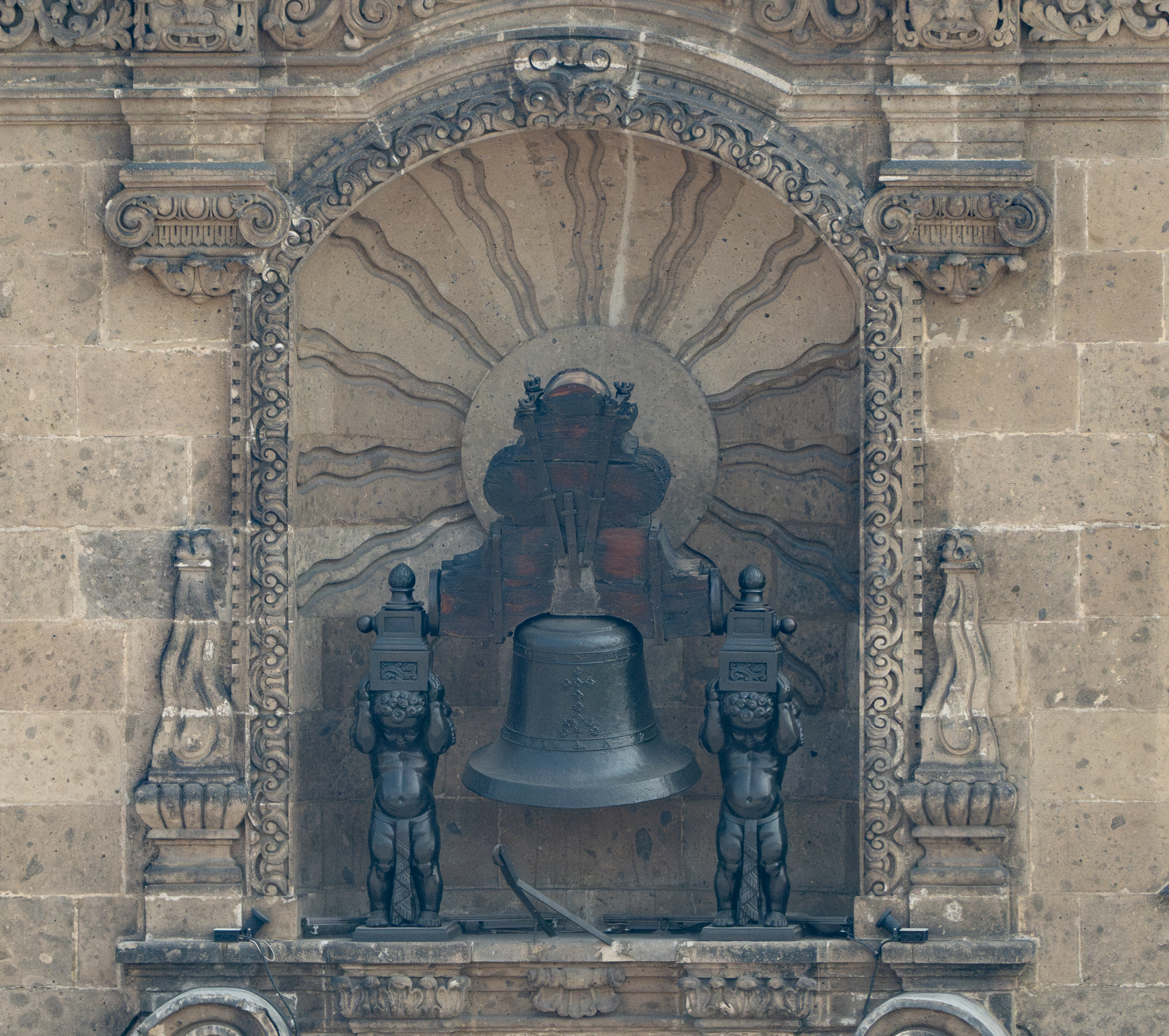
The bell in the facade of the National Palace.

The Bell of Dolores is the bell which, according to tradition, was struck at dawn on 16 September 1810 in Dolores, Guanajuato, México, calling the population to rebel against the authorities of New Spain. The rallying cry was delivered by the parish priest Miguel Hidalgo y Costilla, together with Ignacio Allende and Juan Aldama. This event became known as the Grito de Dolores. Every 15th of September, the President of Mexico strikes the bell to commemorate this call to action. It is now located on the central balcony of the National Palace, in Mexico City.

== History ==
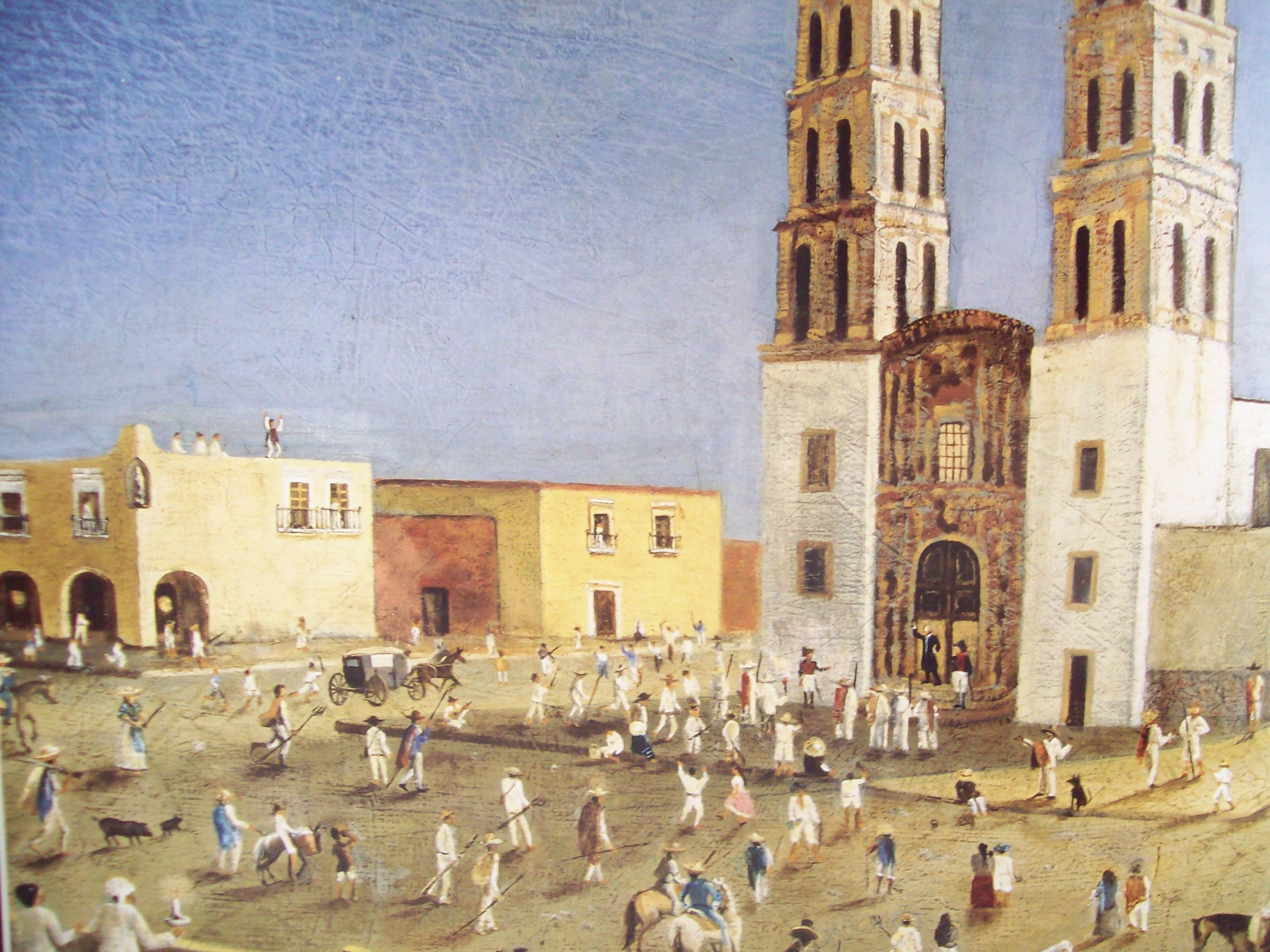
19th century oil on canvas depicting Miguel Hidalgo calling the rebellion, painted by J.J. del Moral.

The bell was cast on the 28 July 1768 and was named Esquilón San José as he was the patron of all of New Spain. It was created to be hung in the east bell tower in the parish church in Dolores. It is cast in bronze; measuring 1.77 meters in height and 1.09 meters in diameter. It is 11 centimeters thick.

In 1896, in an initiative by Guillermo Vayetoo, councillor of festivities for Ayuntamiento de México, as well as the journalist Gabriel Villanueva, President Porfirio Díaz ordered that the bell be brought to the capital of the country. The bell was removed from the tower on 28 July. The generals Sóstenes Rocha and Ignacio Salas were in charge of the bell's transfer. On 14 September, the bell was placed on the central balcony of the Royal Palace, and on 15 September the tradition of the President ringing the bell began.

== Replicas of the bell and later years ==
On 15 September 1960, for the commemoration of the 150th anniversary of the Grito de Independencia and the 50th anniversary of the Mexican Revolution, President Adolfo López Mateos, ordered the founding of 32 identical copies of the Bell of Dolores to be placed in all of the states and territories of Mexico. One bell was specifically allocated to be placed in the bell's original tower. Years later, the government of the Republic sent Piedras Negras, Coahuila another replica of the original bell, making it the only city to have an exact replica that isn't a capital city or birthplace of Independence.

In 1985, for the 175th anniversary of Independence, the original bell was taken down for a tour across the country, together with a Mexican flag and a copy of the constitution.

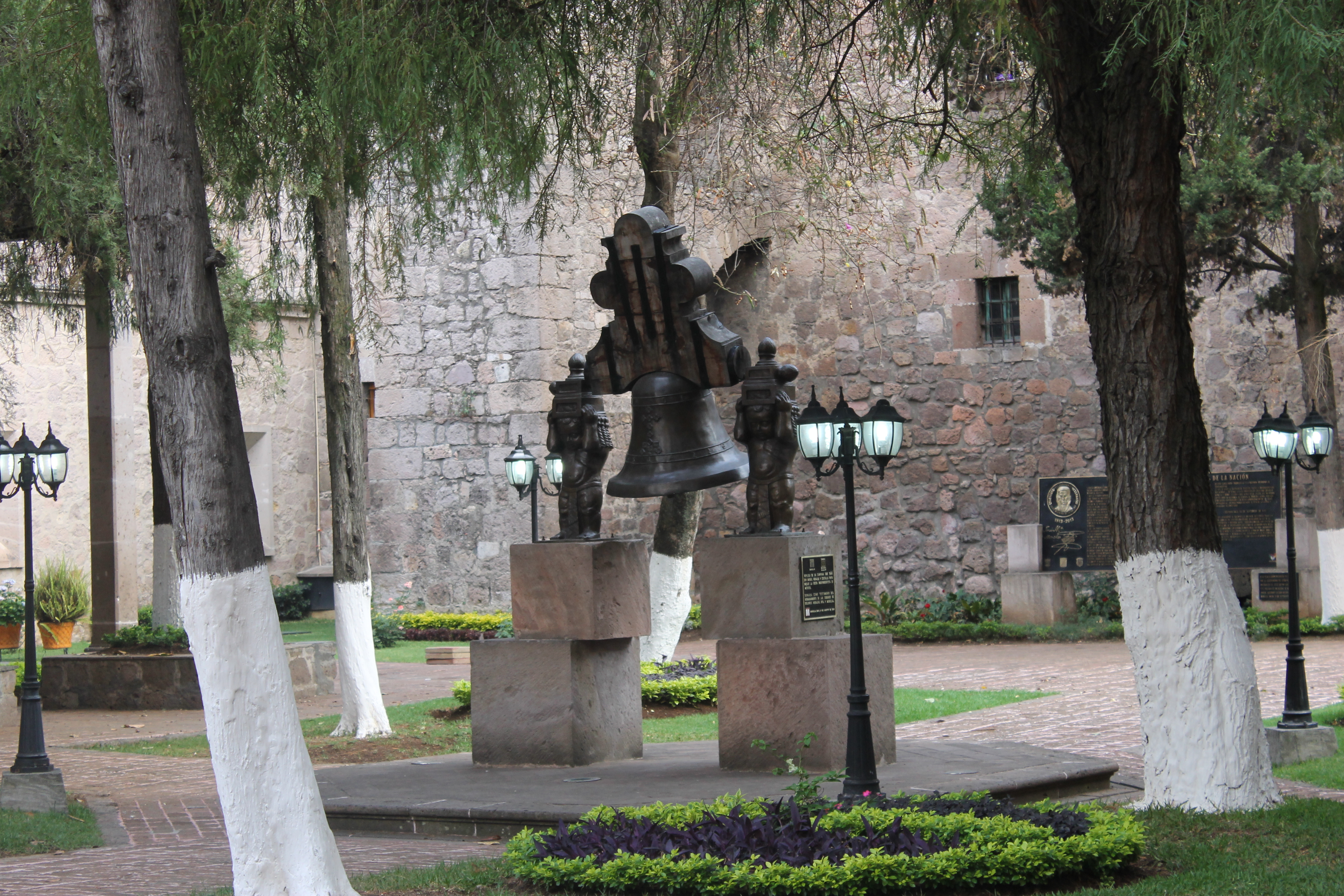
Replica of the bell of Dolores Hidalgo in the Morelos House-Museum, donated to the city of Morelia, Michoacán.

== Significance ==
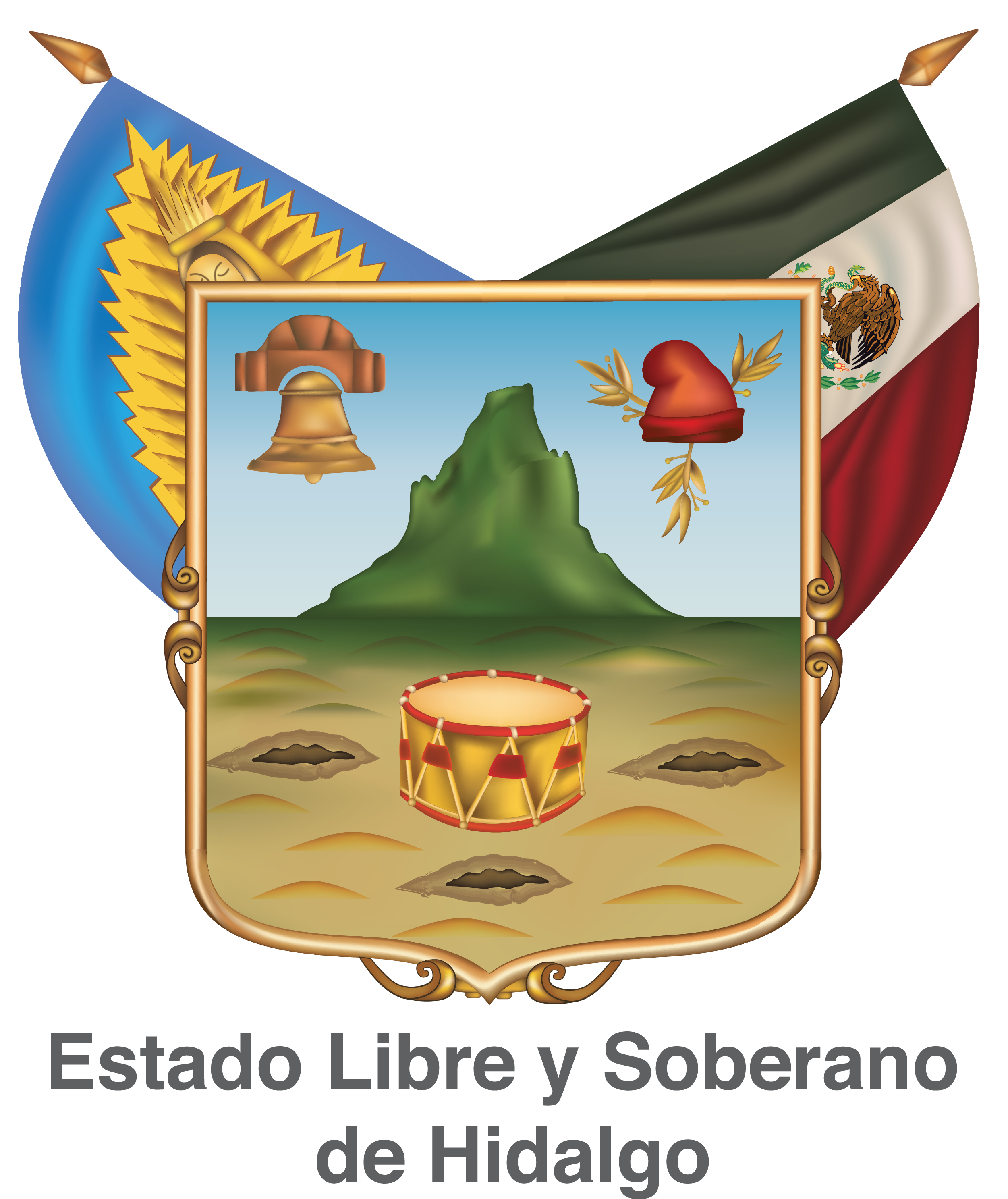
Coat of arms of Hidalgo, on which the bell is depicted.

The Bell of Dolores is one of the patriotic symbols most recognized as an icon of Mexican Independence, along with the Angel of Independence statue on the Paseo de la Reforma. It is the symbol of the Insurgentes stations on Mexico City's Sistema de Transporte Colectivo-Metro as well as the Metrobús. It is also depicted on the coat of arms of the state of Hidalgo where it symbolizes the movement for independence along with the flag of Guadalupe.
