= Plaza Villa de Madrid =

Traffic circle in Colonia Roma, Mexico City, Mexico

Coordinates: 19°25′12″N 99°9′59″W

- Traffic circle
- Nickname: Plaza Cibeles
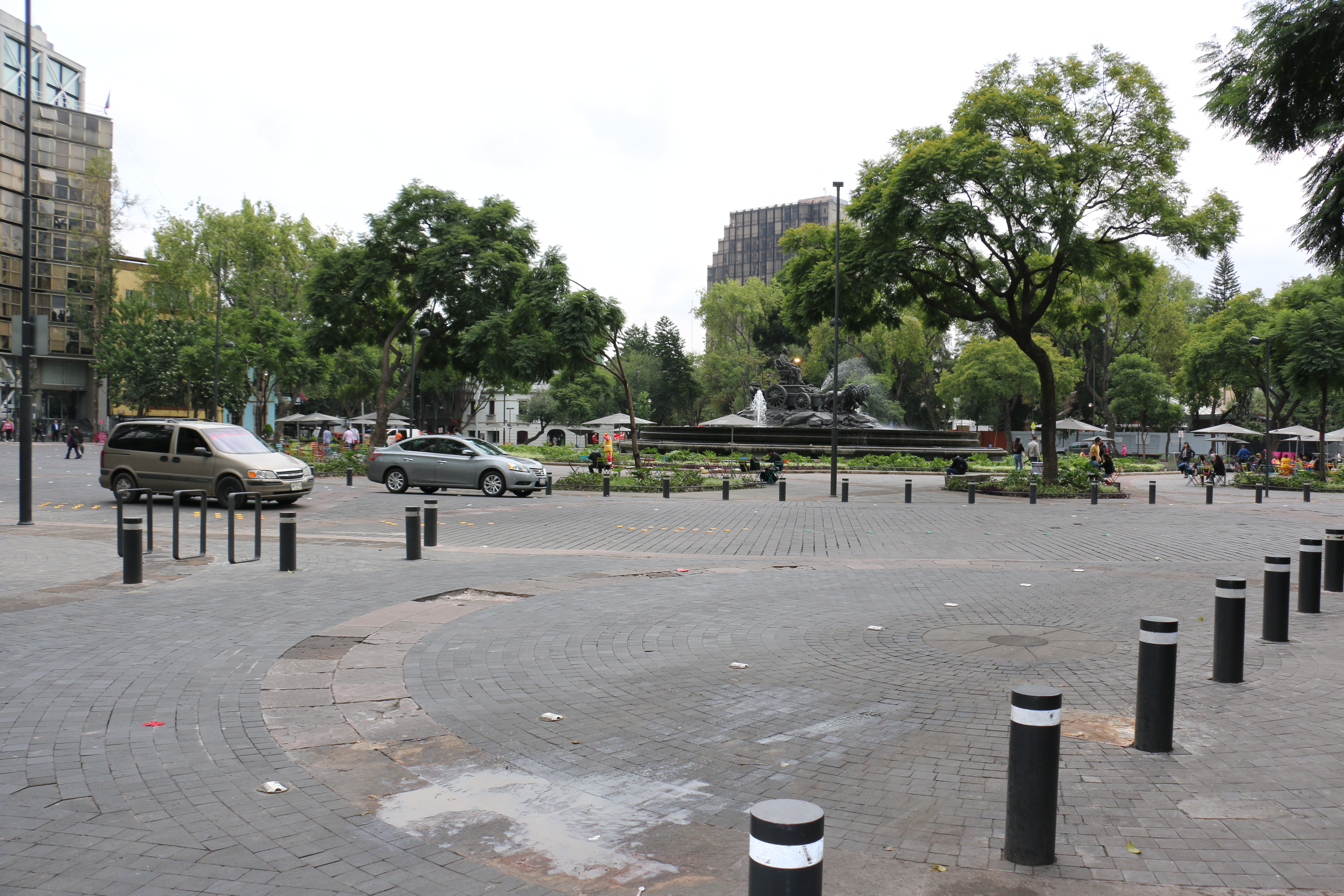
- The roundabout and fountain in 2015
- Features: Fuente de Cibeles
- Location: Colonia Roma, Mexico City
- Interactive map of Plaza Villa de Madrid

Plaza Villa de Madrid (sometimes referred to as "Plaza Cibeles") is a traffic circle in Colonia Roma, Mexico City, where Oaxaca, Durango, Medellín and El Oro streets converge. The Fuente de Cibeles is installed in the center.
