= Glorieta de los Insurgentes =

Large roundabout in Mexico City

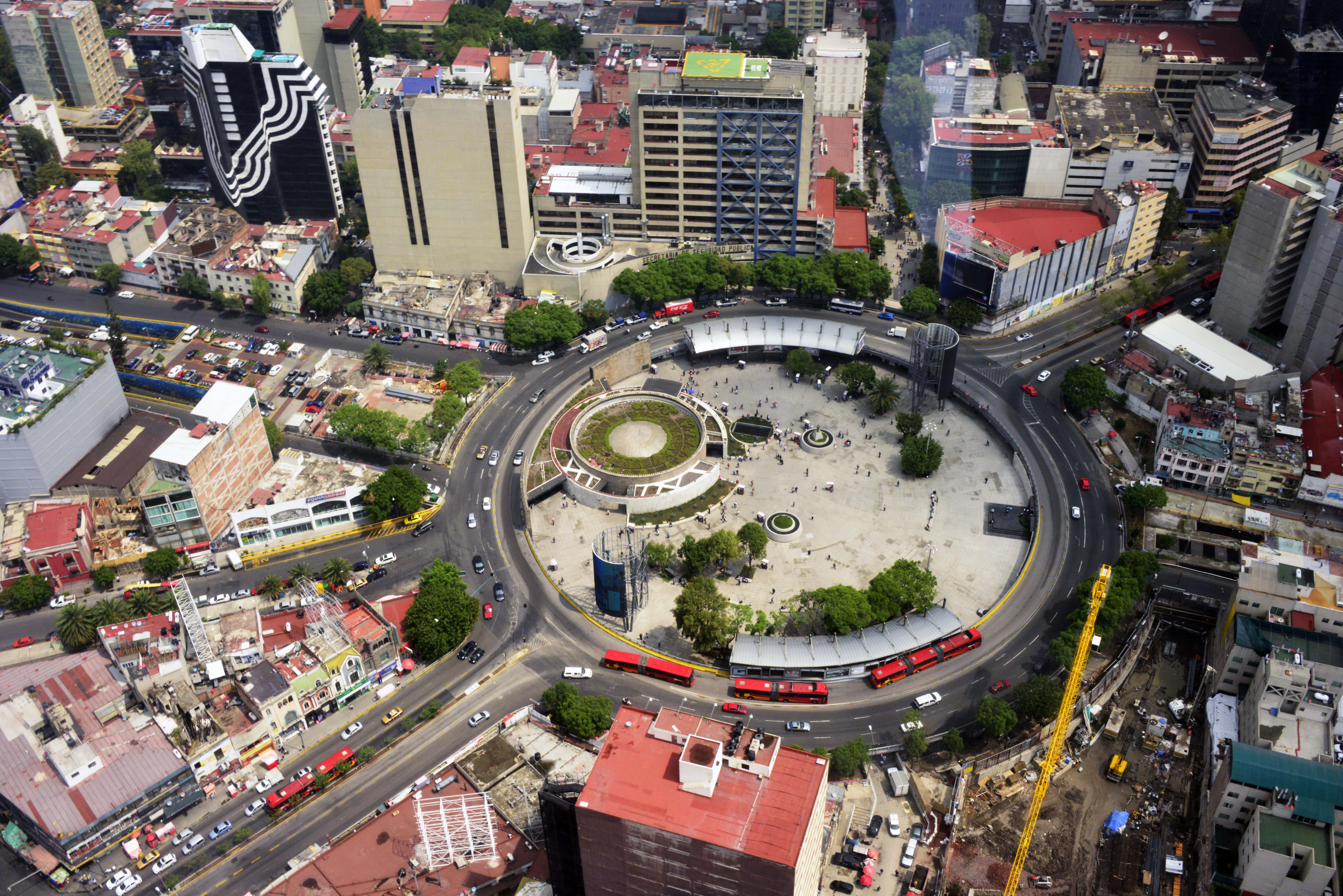
- Aerial view, 2013

- Location within Mexico
- Coordinates: 19.4236392°N 99.162977°W

Glorieta de Insurgentes is a large roundabout in Mexico City formed at the intersection of Avenida Chapultepec and Avenida de los Insurgentes. Oaxaca Avenue connects to it heading southwest to Fuente de Cibeles. The smaller street Génova connects to Zona Rosa. Jalapa connects via one-way traffic from Colonia Roma.

== Description ==
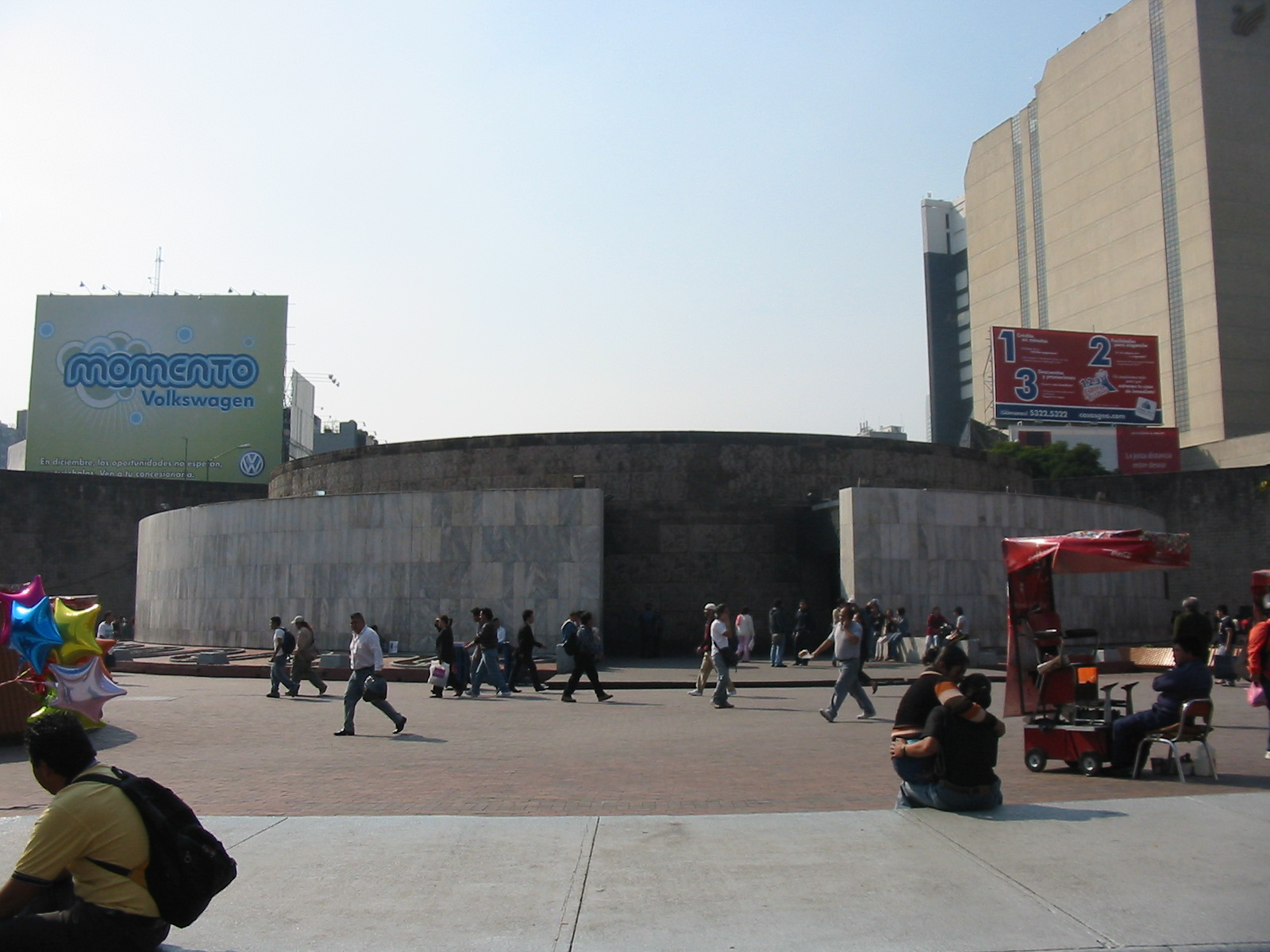
Insurgentes metro station

Glorieta de Insurgentes consists of the vehicular pass of the avenue that gives it its name, the pedestrian center surrounded by shops under it and its access to the Metrobús Insurgentes station and the Insurgentes metro station. Still further down the Metro is the overpass of Avenida Chapultepec. Pedestrians, Metrobús, Metro, cars and heavy transport all converge here.

== Sites ==
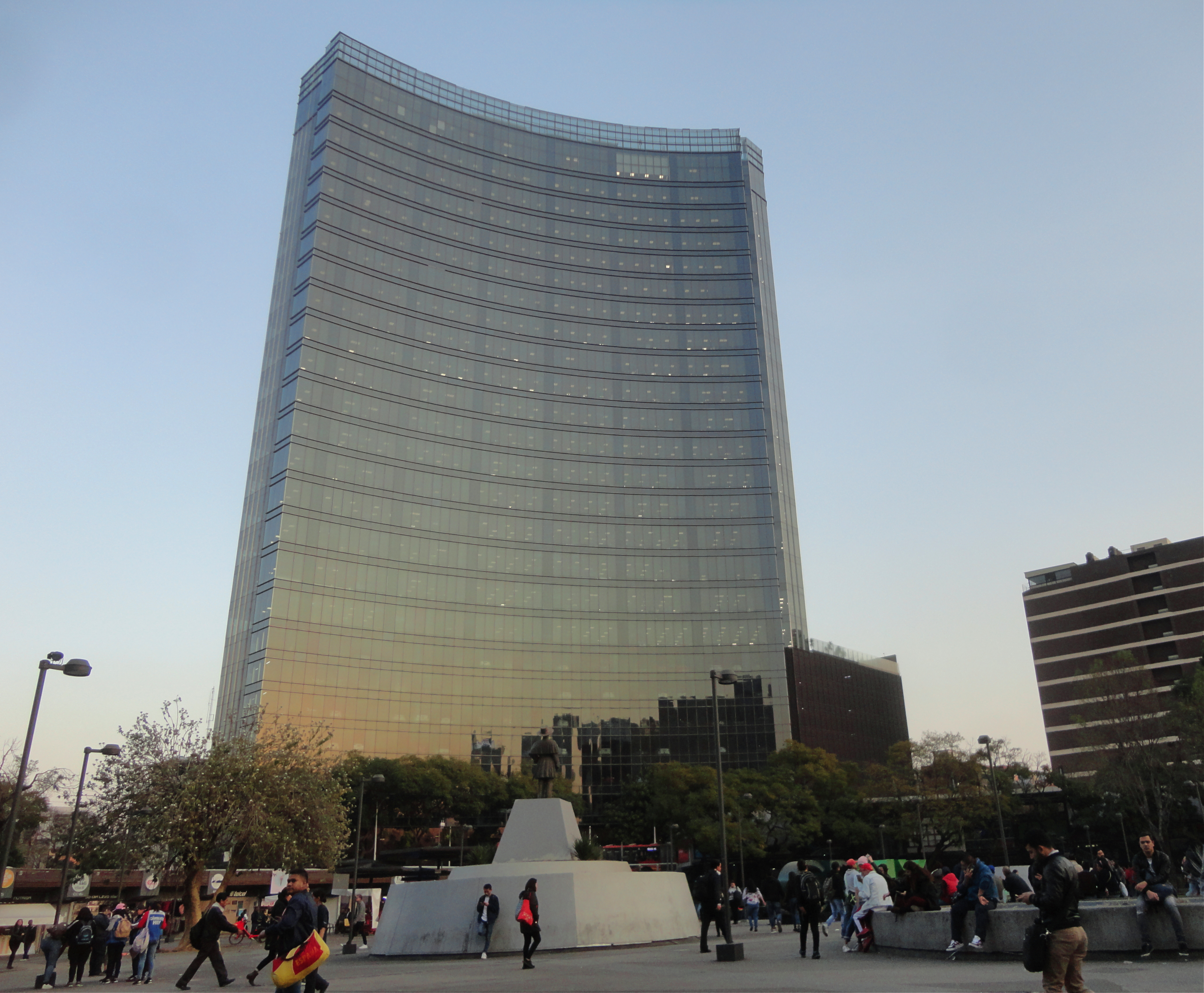
Torre Glorieta

On one side of the Glorieta de Insurgentes is the Zona Rosa, which is one of the most important tourist, commercial and financial places in Mexico City. It is recognized as the area with the most restaurants and nightclubs aimed at the gay population of the city.

To the south of the Glorieta de Insurgentes, in the Colonia Roma Norte, there is a replica of the Fuente de Cibeles. The Public Security Secretariat of the Federal District and several schools, cinemas, hospitals and places are located around the Glorieta de Insurgentes.
