= Insurgentes metro station =

Mexico City metro station

Insurgentes
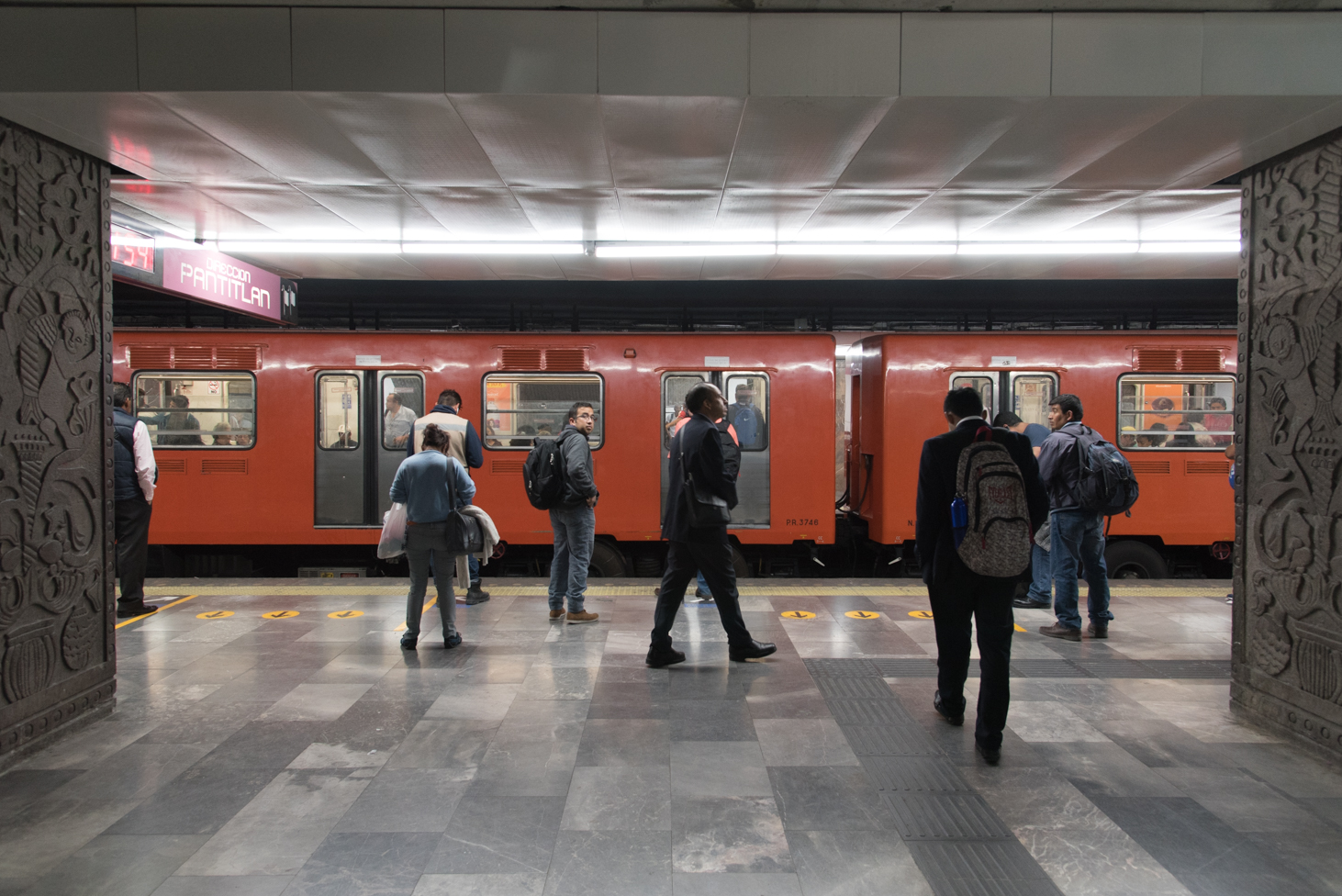
- Platforms as of August 2018

General information
- Location: Glorieta de los Insurgentes; Colonia Juárez, Cuauhtémoc; Mexico City; Mexico
- Coordinates: 19.423292°N 99.163177°W
- System: Mexico City Metro
- Operator: Sistema de Transporte Colectivo (STC)
- Platforms: 2 side platforms
- Tracks: 2
- Connections: Glorieta de los Insurgentes; Insurgentes stop (temporary)

Construction
- Structure type: Underground
- Platform levels: 1
- Parking: No
- Cycle facilities: Yes

Other information
- Status: In service

History
- Opened: 4 September 1969; 57 years ago

Passengers
- 2025: 7,664,365 (Note: The data here is limited to the most recent ten years to avoid excessive listings; earlier figures can be found in this page's history or on the Mexico City Metro website. To calculate the average daily ridership, the annual total is divided by 365 days (366 in leap years), with decimals omitted from the result. Each station per line is ranked individually, as the system counts transfer stations separately. The percentage change is calculated automatically using the data from the current year and the previous year.)
- Rank: 52/195

Services
| Preceding station | Mexico City Metro | Following station |
|---|---|---|
| Sevilla toward Observatorio | Line 1 | Cuauhtémoc toward Pantitlán |
Route map
Location
- Location within Mexico City
- Area map

Insurgentes is a station on the Line 1 of Mexico City Metro. It is located within the Glorieta de los Insurgentes at the intersection of Avenida de los Insurgentes and Avenida Chapultepec in Mexico City's Cuauhtémoc borough, close to the Zona Rosa shopping and entertainment district and the Colonia Roma, two of the most iconic neighborhoods in the city. In 2019, the station had an average ridership of 65,134 passengers per day, making it the 12th busiest station in the network. From November 2023 to April 2025, the station remained closed for modernization work on the tunnel and the line's technical equipment.

== Name and pictogram ==
Insurgentes receives its name from Avenida de los Insurgentes, one of Mexico City's most important thoroughfares, the station is located under the intersection of Insurgentes and Avenida Chapultepec.

The station pictogram depicts the Bell of Dolores, which is named for Dolores Hidalgo and serves as a symbol of the start of the Mexican War of Independence (1810) and the eleven-year-long insurgency that followed.

== General information ==
Metro Insurgentes was built in a particular style. Surrounding the station is a circular shopping mall-cum-plaza, called the Glorieta de los Insurgentes. The station's exterior walls are intended to evoke pre-Hispanic architecture, while the platform walls are decorated with mock-ups of platforms from the Paris Métro and the London Underground. The station was opened on 5 September 1969. Exterior shots of the plaza and metro entrance were used in the 1990 motion picture Total Recall.

This is an important station for bus transfers, connecting with an extensive local network of urban buses (RTP, or Red de Transporte de Pasajeros) that serves zones like Villa Olímpica and Tlalpan, south of the city, and Metro Indios Verdes, north of the city. The Insurgentes Metrobús bus rapid transit line also has a stop in the vicinity of Metro Insurgentes.

In recent years, the Glorieta de los Insurgentes (and, therefore, the station itself), has been a meeting and starting point for some social and political rallies; for example, in December 2019, it was used as a meeting point for several feminist rallies.

The station serves the following neighborhoods: Colonia Juárez and Colonia Roma Norte.

== Nearby ==
- Glorieta de los Insurgentes, roundabout with a small plaza and commerces.
- Zona Rosa, neighborhood known for its shopping, nightlife, gay community and Korean community.
- Plaza Río de Janeiro, square.
- Fuente de Cibeles, replica of the fountain located in the Plaza de Cibeles in Madrid.

== Exits ==
- Southwest: Oaxaca street, Colonia Roma Norte
- Southeast: Avenida de los Insurgentes, Colonia Roma Norte
- South: Jalapa street, Colonia Roma Norte
- Northeast: Avenida Chapultepec, Colonia Juárez
- North: Genova street, Colonia Juárez
- Northwest: Avenida Chapultepec, Colonia Juárez

== Station layout ==
| G | Street Level |
| B1 | Glorieta de los Insurgentes | Entrance/Exit |
| B2 | Mezzanine | Ticket windows/Fare control |
| B3 | Side platform, doors will open on the left |
| B3 | Eastbound | toward Pantitlán (Cuauhtémoc) → |
| B3 | Westbound | ← toward Observatorio (Sevilla) |
| B3 | Side platform, doors will open on the right |

== Ridership ==
Annual passenger ridership
| Year | Ridership | Average daily | Rank | % change | Ref. |
|---|---|---|---|---|---|
| 2025 | 7,664,365 | 20,998 | 52/195 | NA |
| 2024 | 0 | 0 | 189/195 | −100.00% |
| 2023 | 8,458,386 | 23,173 | 40/195 | −28.40% |
| 2022 | 11,812,681 | 32,3636 | 16/195 | +71.71% |
| 2021 | 6,879,516 | 18,847 | 28/195 | −35.14% |
| 2020 | 10,606,513 | 28,979 | 14/195 | −48.89% |
| 2019 | 20,753,676 | 56,859 | 13/195 | +3.29% |
| 2018 | 20,092,422 | 55,047 | 13/195 | −0.88% |
| 2017 | 20,271,258 | 55,537 | 14/195 | −6.74% |
| 2016 | 21,737,014 | 59,390 | 12/195 | −5.96% |

== Gallery ==
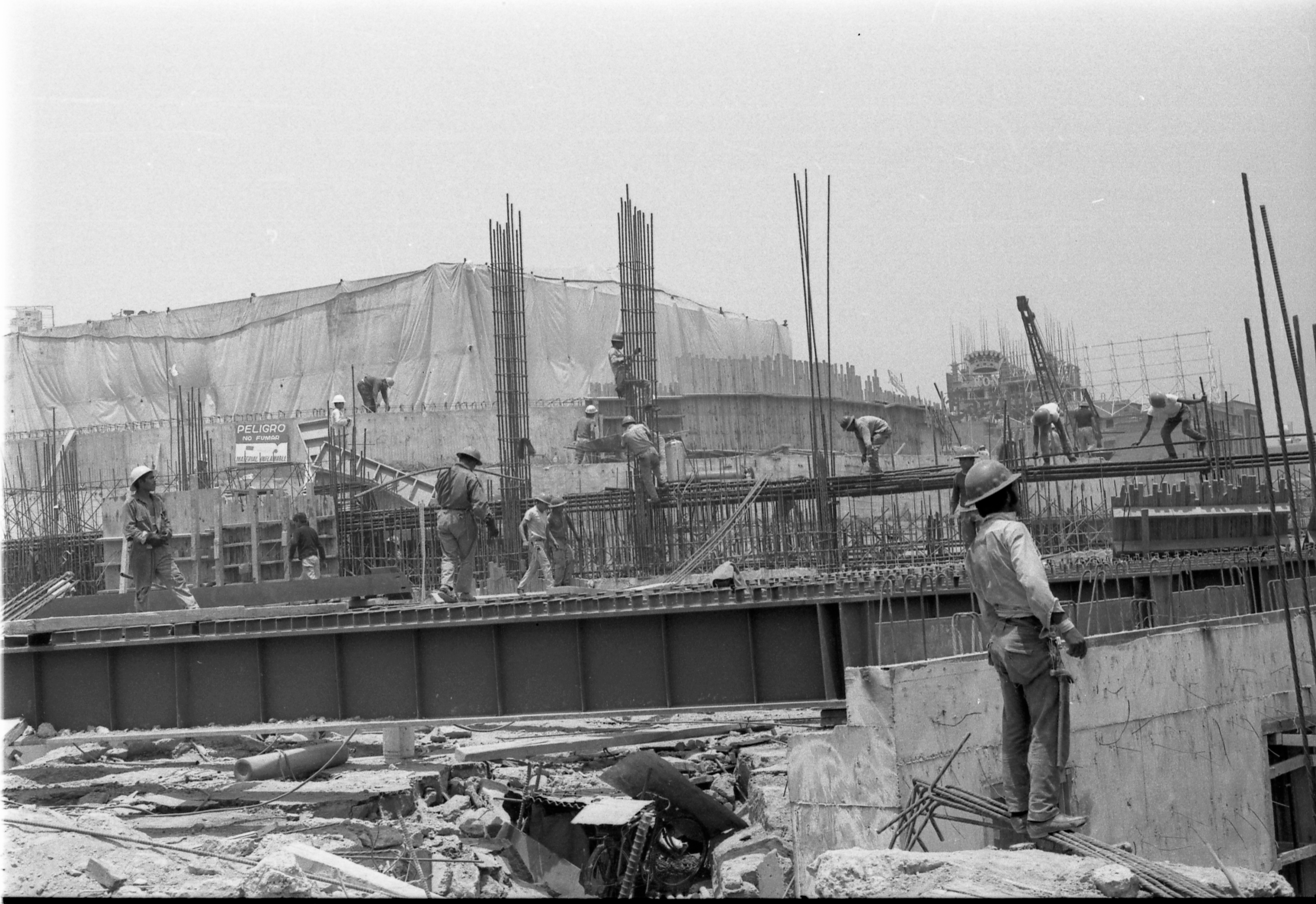
Works of construction at Insurgentes Station, 1969.

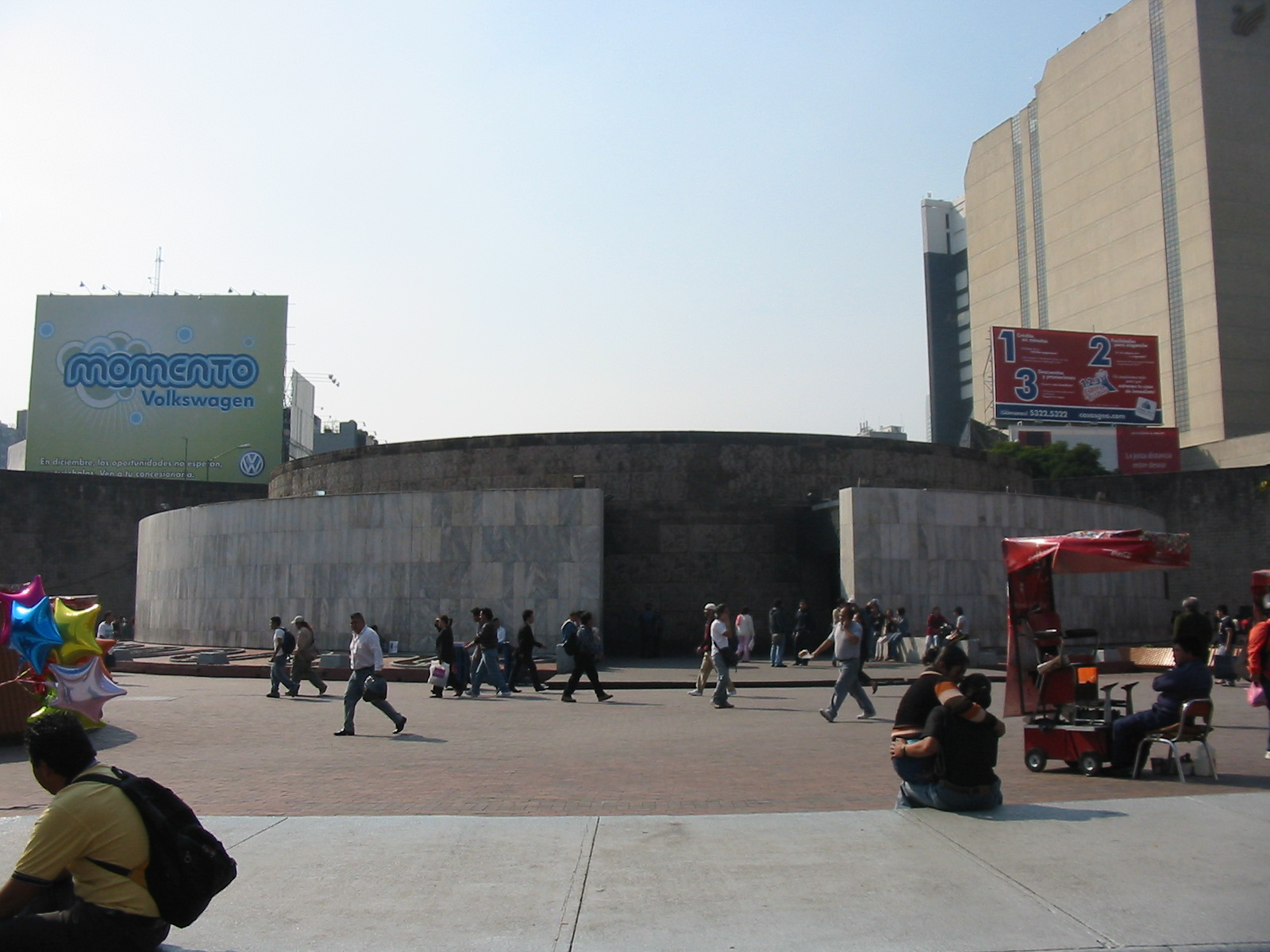
View of outside entrance of Metro Insurgentes at the Insurgentes Glorieta roundabout.

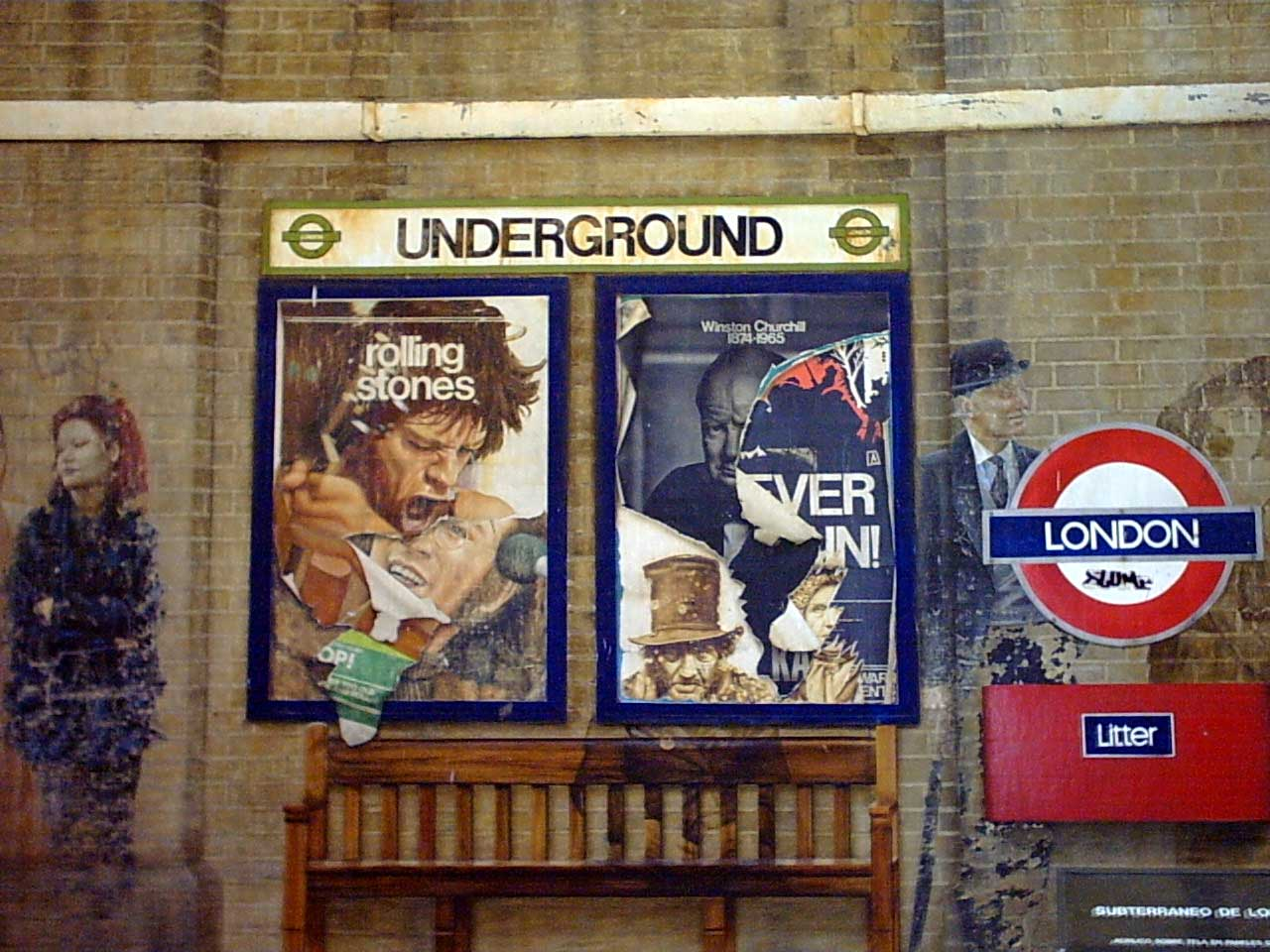
Rafael Cauduro's mural depicting the London Underground

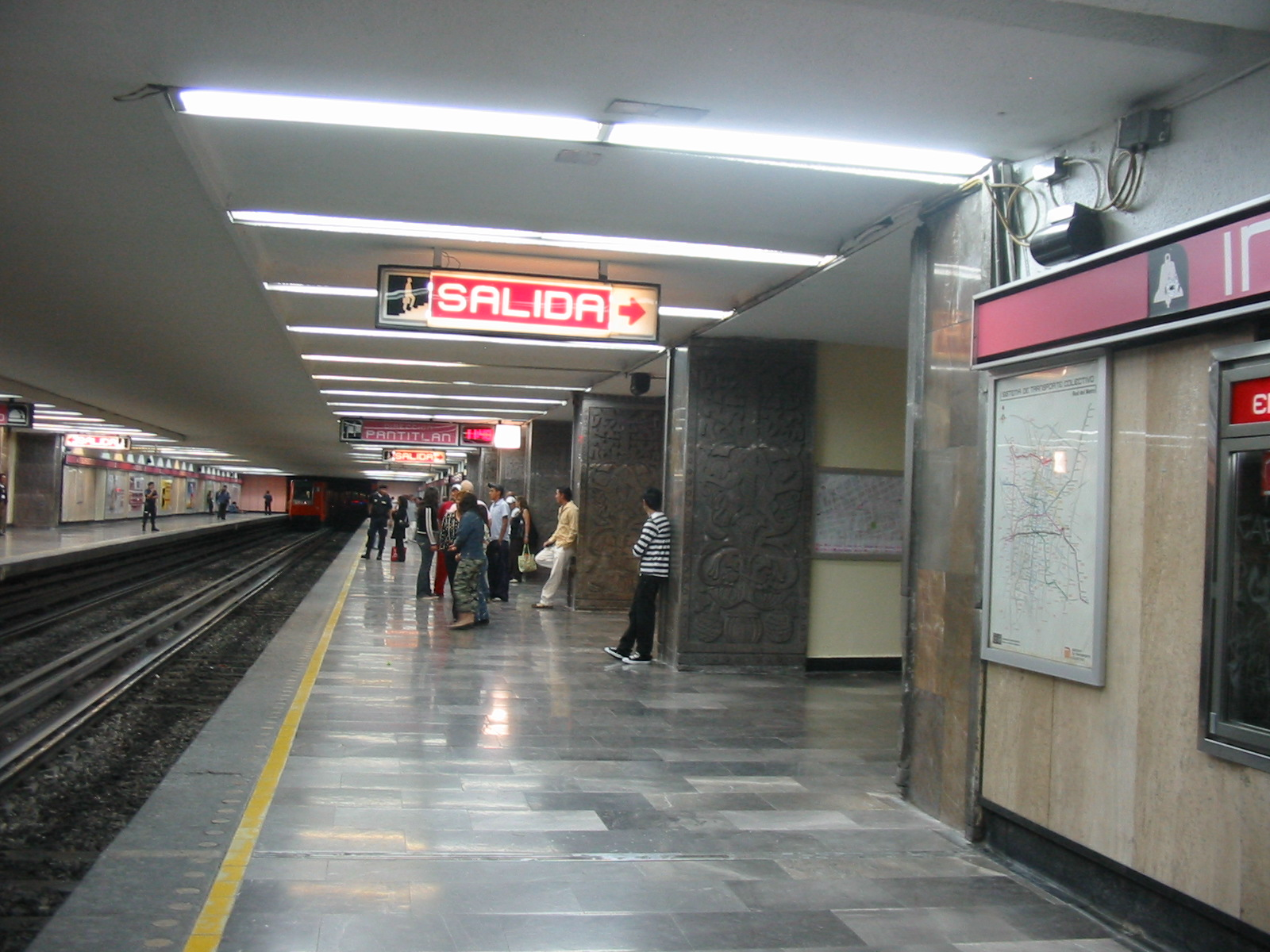
Station platforms
