= El Sereno (sculpture) =

Sculpture in Mexico City, Mexico

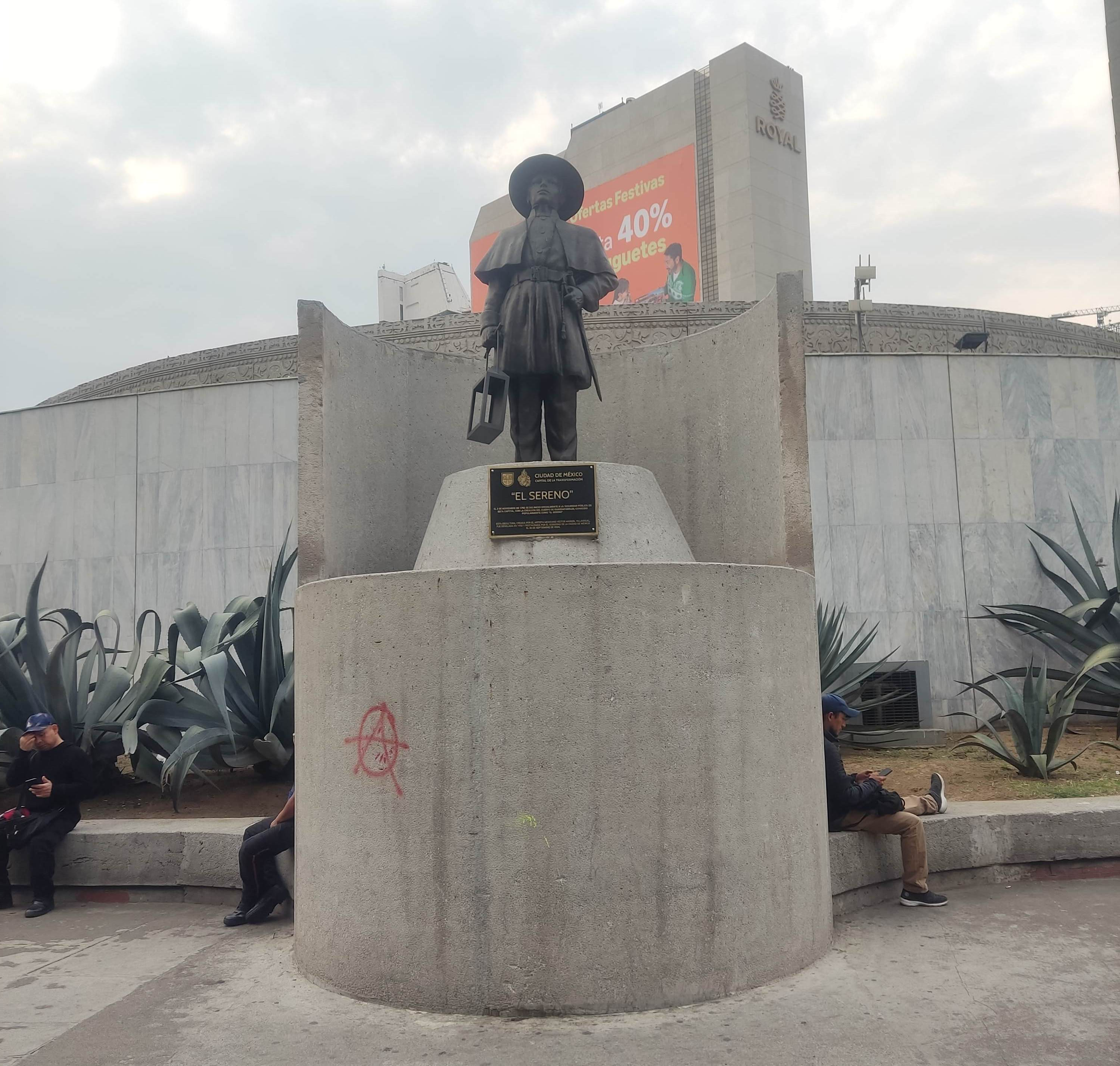
- The statue in 2025
- Artist: Víctor Manuel Villareal
- Year: 1992
- Subject: Watchman
- Condition: Restored (2024)
- Location: Mexico City, Mexico; 19°25′25.3″N 99°9′47″W

El Sereno (Spanish: lit. transl. The Watchman) is a statue installed at Glorieta de los Insurgentes, a roundabout in Avenida de los Insurgentes, in Cuauhtémoc, Mexico City. The statue was designed by Víctor Manuel Villareal and was unveiled in 1992. It depicts a watchman, a position that once represented law enforcement. Originally, El Sereno included a lamp and a plaque, both of which were removed or stolen before 2016.

By 2024, the roundabout had become a hotspot for crime and a shelter for homeless people. Multiple structures, including El Sereno, were covered in graffiti. In July of that year, the roundabout was cleared. The city government rehabilitated the space, including restoration and relocation of El Sereno. The roundabout was reopened in September 2024.

== Gallery ==
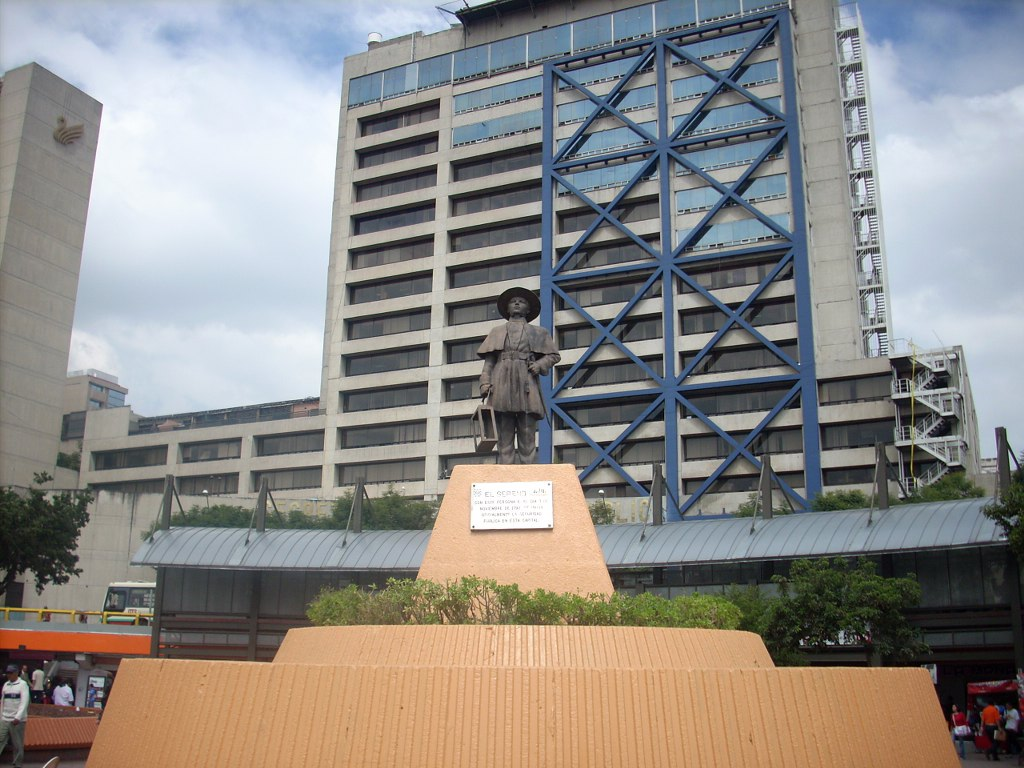
The sculpture in 2007 featuring its original lamp and plaque

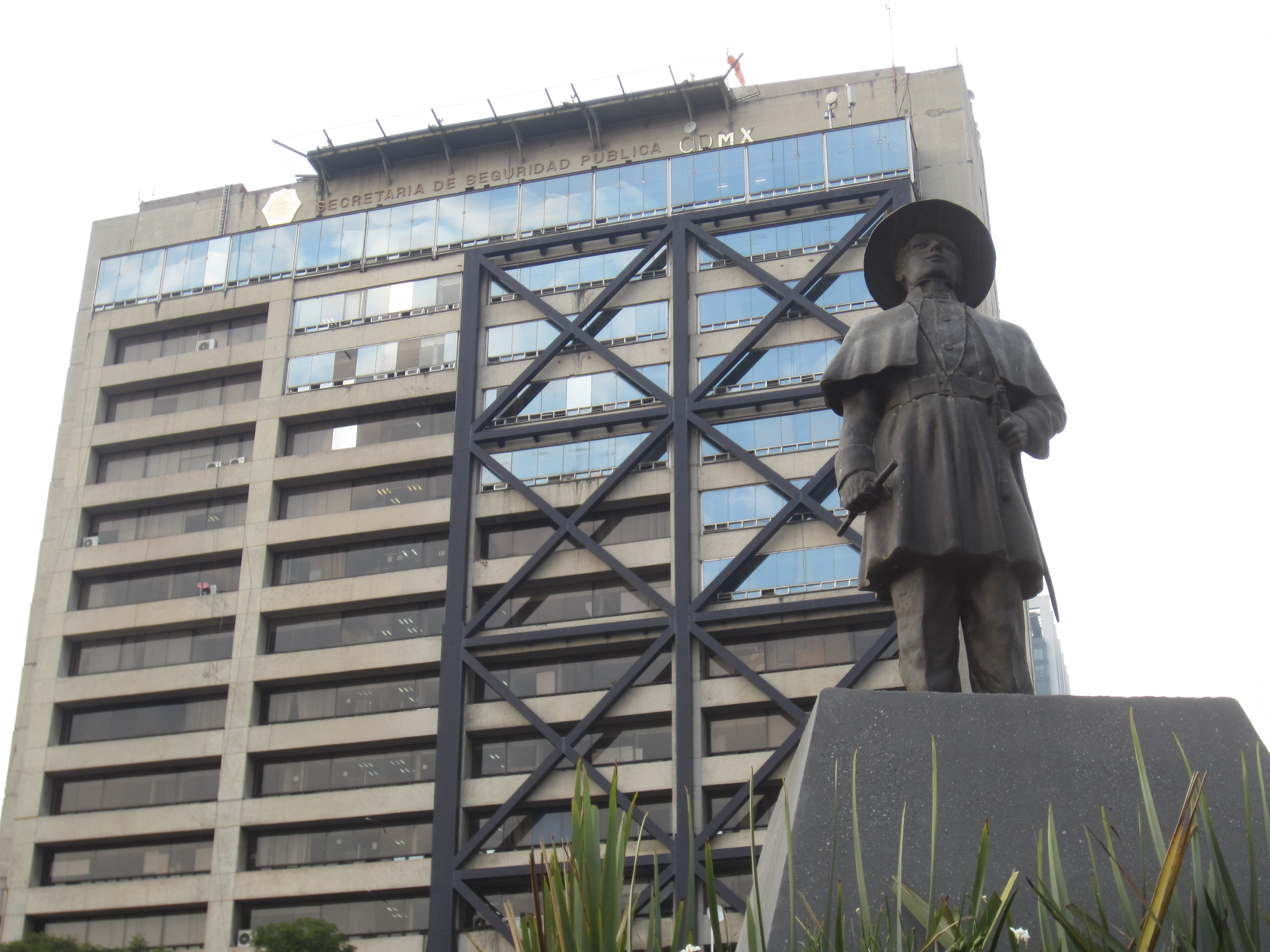
The sculpture in 2018 without its lamp and plaque, years before its relocation
