= Sereno =

Sereno may refer to:

== Music ==
- Sereno (album), a 2002 album by Miguel Bosé

== People ==
=== Given name ===
- Sereno Edwards Bishop (1827–1909), scientist, Presbyterian minister and publisher
- Sereno E. Brett (1891–1952), Brigadier General of the United States Army
- Sereno Edwards Dwight (1786–1850), American author, educator, minister, and Chaplain of the Senate
- Sereno Peck Fenn (1844–1927), American businessman
- Sereno E. Payne (1843–1914), United States Representative from New York
- Sereno Watson (1826–1892), American botanist

=== Surname ===
- Costantino Sereno (1829–1893), Italian painter
- Henrique Sereno (born 1985), Portuguese footballer
- Maria Lourdes Sereno (born 1960), de facto Chief Justice of the Supreme Court of the Philippines between August 25, 2012 and May 11, 2018
- Paul Sereno (born 1957), American paleontologist
- Paulo Jorge Fernandes Sereno (born 1983), Portuguese footballer
- Ronaldo Marques Sereno (born 1962), Brazilian footballer

== Occupations ==
- Sereno (occupation), a neighborhood night watchman and key custodian, primarily in Spain and Peru

== Places ==
- Sereno, Missouri, United States
- Sereno del Mar, California, United States
- Sereno River, Brazil
- Río Sereno, Panama

== See also ==
- El Sereno (disambiguation)
