= Fuente de Cibeles (Mexico City) =

Fountain and sculpture in Mexico City, Mexico

- Fountain of Cybele (English)
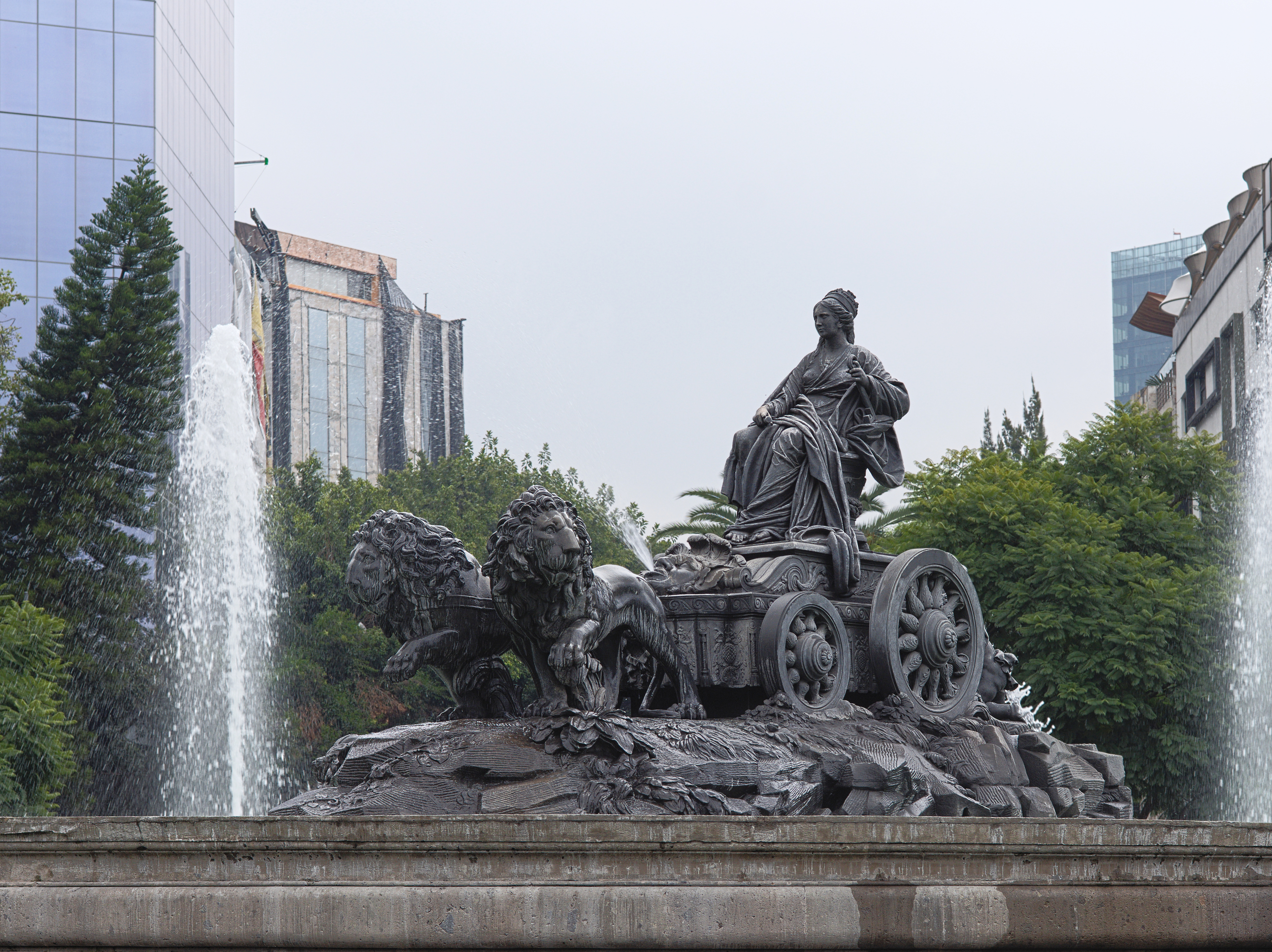
- The fountain in 2009
- Artist: Ventura Rodríguez
- Year: 1980
- Medium: Bronze
- Subject: Cybele
- Dimensions: 5.5 m × 4.7 m × 12.5 m (18 ft × 15 ft × 41 ft)
- Weight: 12 tons
- Location: Mexico City; 19°25′12″N 99°09′59″W

The Fountain of Cybele (Spanish: Fuente de Cibeles) in Mexico City is a bronze statue installed in Colonia Roma in 1980, and refurbished in 2011. A symbol of brotherhood between the Spanish and Mexican communities, it is a replica of the fountain located in the Plaza de Cibeles in Madrid that was built by architect Ventura Rodríguez between 1777 and 1792. The Mexican version is located at a traffic circle in Plaza Villa de Madrid, where Oaxaca, Durango, Medellín and El Oro streets converge in Colonia Roma. The plaza and statue are considered emblematic sights of Mexico City.

== Symbolism ==
The goddess Cybele, Roman goddess of fertility, wears a crown and carries a scepter and key, symbols of her power over Earth and the seasons. Her carriage is pulled by two lions representing Hippomenes and his wife Atalanta, one of the huntresses of the goddess Diana, both turned into lions by Zeus.

== History ==
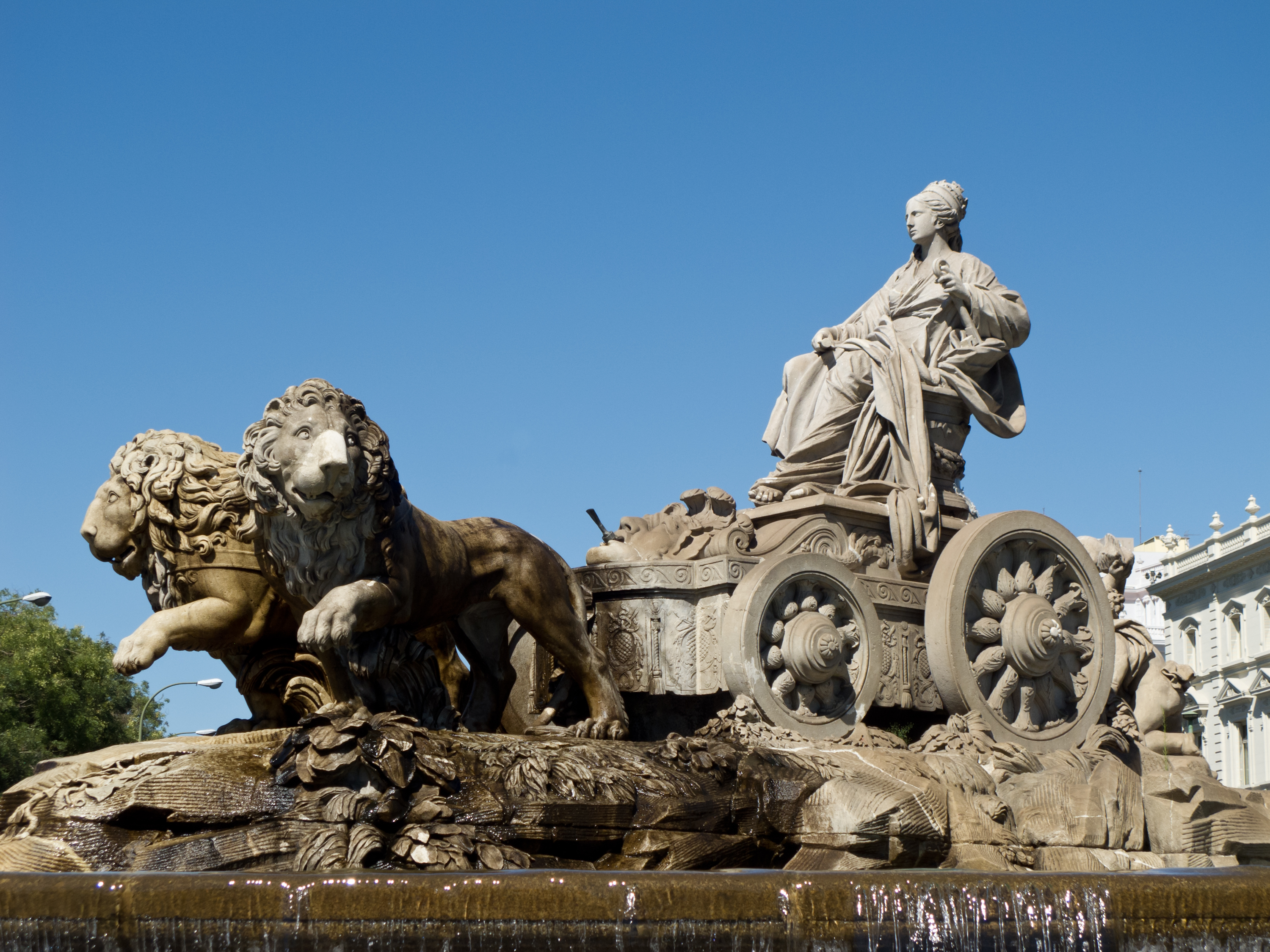
Original fountain in Madrid

The fountain was inaugurated on September 5, 1980, by Mexican President José López Portillo, Madrid mayor, Enrique Tierno Galván and Mexico City mayor Carlos Hank González. Féretro

The fountain is located in a plaza which used to be the Plaza of Miraville "created in the 19th century at the intersection of the antique carriageway of access to the lands that belonged to the family of the third Countess of Miravalle". Today they are Durango and Oaxaca streets. Underneath this plaza there was a well that served as the main source of drinking water for the Colonia Roma. This copy of the Spanish fountain was donated by Spanish immigrants to Mexico.

In 2011, the then mayor of Mexico City, Marcelo Ebrard, announced that the fountain was one of the 67 monuments to receive maintenance and refurbishment. The renovation included the "reintegration of missing pieces, restoration of bronze sculptures, rehabilitation of the water system, improvement of green areas and illumination with the objective of reducing electrical energy spending [by] 30%". The re-inauguration of the fountain was on January 21, 2011, by the same mayor, the Spanish ambassador to Mexico Manuel Alabart, and Secretary of Works and Services of the Government of the Federal District, Fernando Aboitiz.

== Description and access ==
The sculptural group measures approximately 12.5 meters long, 4.7 meters in width and 5.5 meters tall with a weight of 12 tons. It is located two blocks away from Metro Insurgentes and two blocks away from the Durango Metrobus station at the crossing of four streets: Oaxaca, Durango, Medellin and El Oro.

The fountain is located in the middle of a traffic circle surrounded by stores and restaurants that make up the Plaza Cibeles. Once a week, a flea market is set up, commonly known as "el tianguis de la Cibeles" or "el bazar de Oro".

== Spanish community ==
The fountain was donated by the community of Spanish residents in Mexico and was "erected as a symbol of brotherhood between both metropolises", Mexico City and Madrid.

The ambassador of Spain in Mexico, Manuel Alabart, thanked the head of government of the Federal District Marcelo Ebrard for the renovations made in 2011 of what he called an "emblematic space" making Madrid and Mexico City closer, as well as for the "warmth and hospitality the city gives to almost 40 thousand Spanish that live in the Federal District". Ebrard also mentioned the importance of the emblematic work of the refurbishment that "strengthens the ties of friendship between Spain and Mexico".

Even the business district surrounding the Plaza Cibeles is known for its Madrilenian style and influence. It has also become a tradition for the fountain to be the meeting place for fans of the Spanish soccer team in celebrating its victories.
