= Instituto Nacional de Neurología y Neurocirugía =

National Institute of Neurology and Neurosurgery Manuel Velasco Suárez
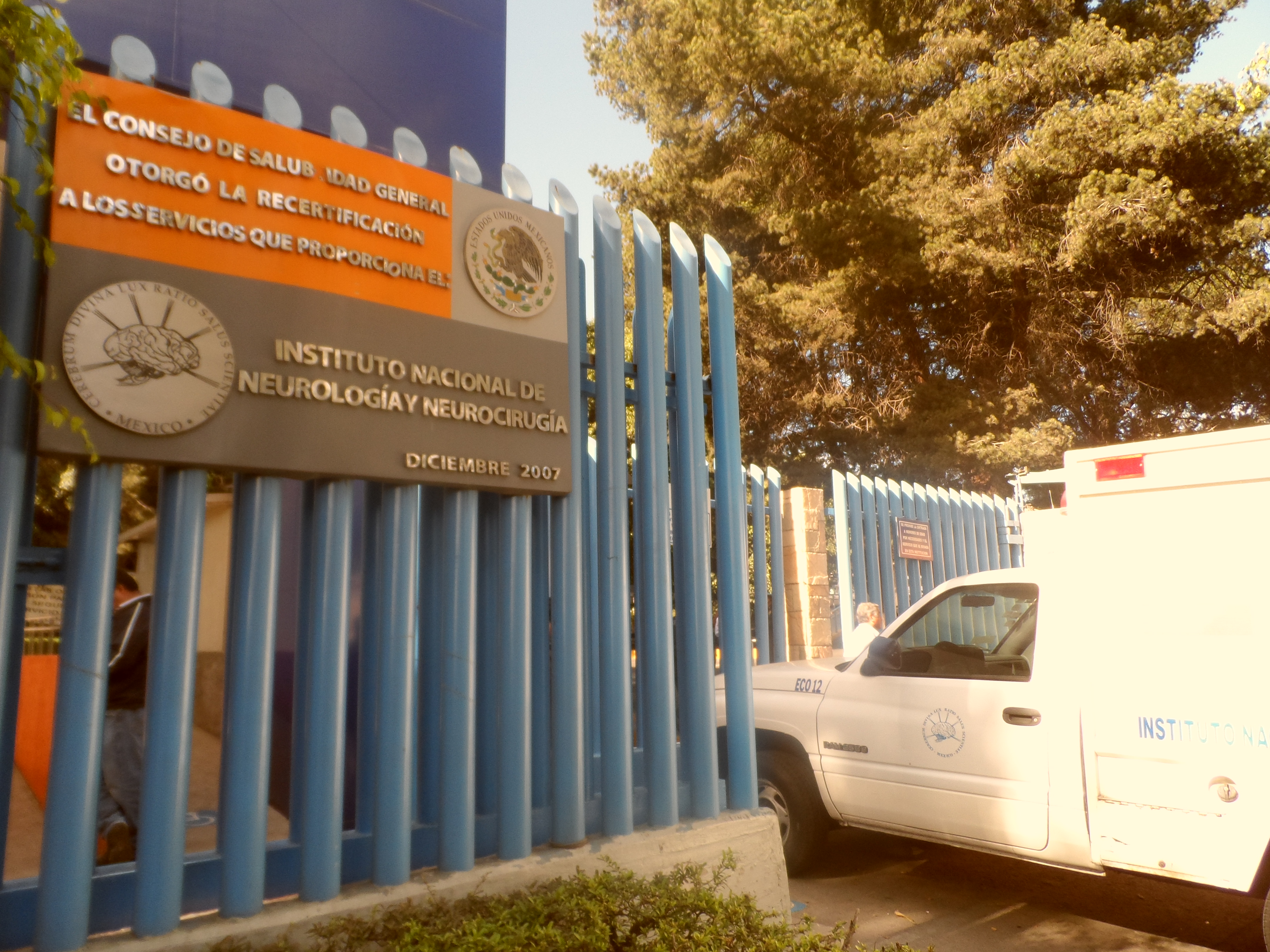

Geography
- Location: Mexico City, Mexico
- Coordinates: 19°17′26.09″N 99°10′30.58″W

Organisation
- Care system: Public

Services
- Beds: 126

History
- Founded: 1964

Links
- Website: www.gob.mx/salud/innn
- Lists: Hospitals in Mexico

The National Institute of Neurology and Neurosurgery (Instituto Nacional de Neurología y Neurocirugía, or INNN) is a public hospital in Mexico City.

The hospital has 126 beds for patients in neurosurgery, neurology, and psychiatry.

== History ==
The INNN was founded in 1964. One of its founders, Manuel Velasco Suárez became its first director and the hospital was later renamed for him.
