= Colonia Roma =

- Neighborhood
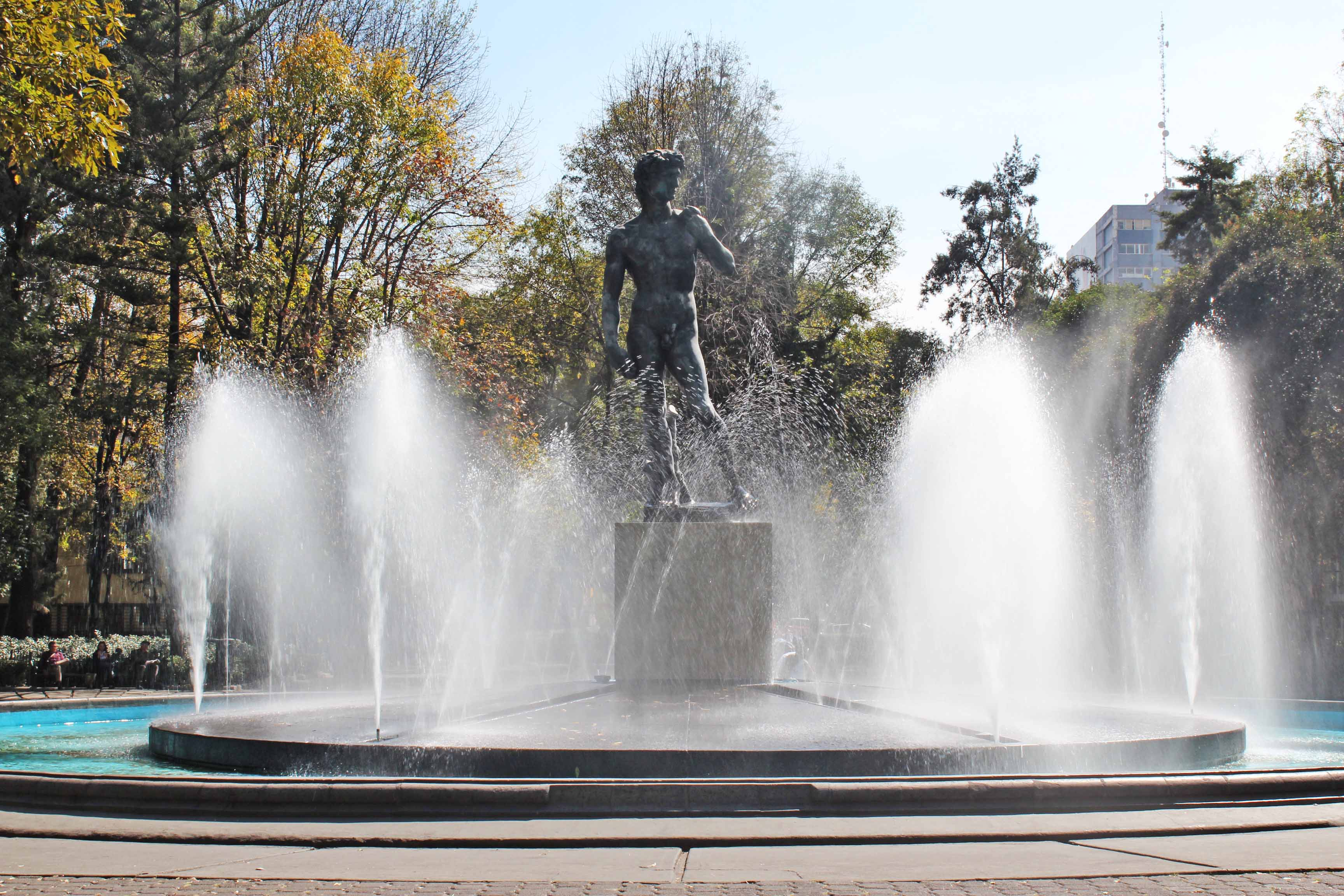
- Replica of Michelangelo's David in Plaza Río de Janeiro, a symbol of Colonia Roma

- Location in central Mexico City
- Coordinates: 19.411917°N 99.159583°W
- Country: Mexico
- City: Mexico City
- Borough: Cuauhtémoc

Population (2010)
  - Total: 45,205

By official neighborhood
  - Roma Norte: 27,770
  - Roma Sur: 17,435

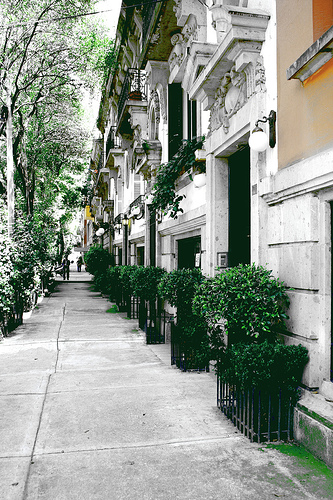
Buildings along Colima Street in Colonia Roma

Colonia Roma, also called La Roma or simply, Roma, is a district located in the Cuauhtémoc borough of Mexico City just west of the city's historic center. The area comprises two colonias: Roma Norte and Roma Sur, divided by Coahuila street.

The colonia was originally planned as an upper-class Porfirian neighborhood in the early twentieth century. By the 1940s, it had become a middle-class neighborhood in slow decline, with the downswing being worsened by the 1985 Mexico City earthquake. Since the 2000s, the area has seen increasing gentrification.

Roma and neighbouring Condesa are known for being the epicenter of trendy/hipster subculture in the city, and Roma has consequently been called the "Williamsburg of Mexico City". Additionally, the area rivals Polanco as the center of the city's culinary scene. Besides residential buildings, the neighborhood streets are lined with restaurants, bars, clubs, shops, cultural centers, churches and galleries. Many are housed in former Art Nouveau and Neo-Classical buildings dating from the Porfiriato period at the beginning of the 20th century. Roma was designated as a "Barrio Mágico" ("magical neighborhood") by the city in 2011.

== History ==
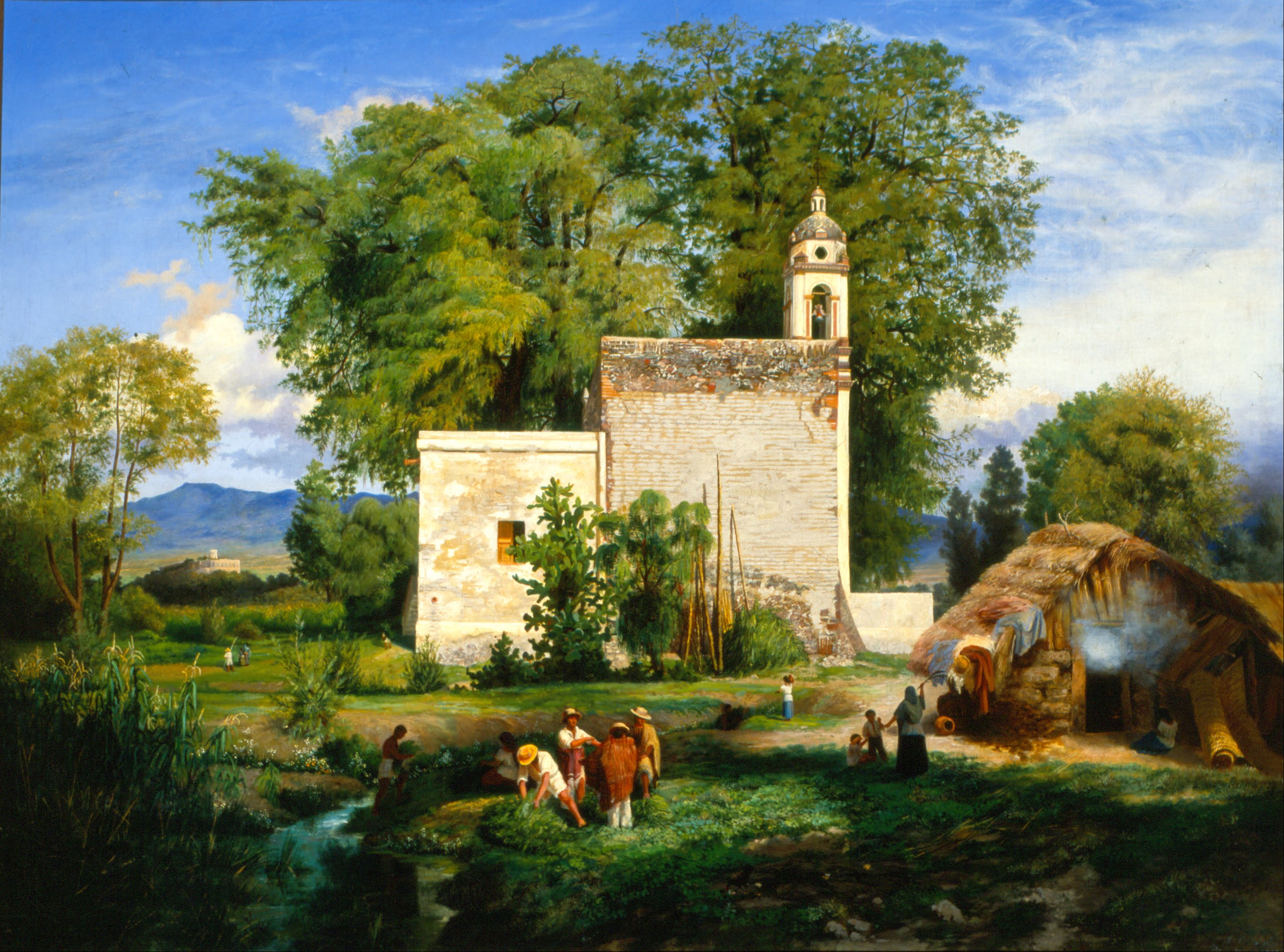
Paisaje de San Cristóbal Romita, Luis Coto, 1857. In the distance on the left can be seen Chapultepec Castle.

The area was a very shallow part of Lake Texcoco, dotted with tiny islands and one small island village of Aztacalco during the pre-Hispanic period. During the colonial period, the area dried up and became rural lands first owned by Hernán Cortés and then by the Counts of Miravalle. The village that would become known as La Romita was connected to the village of San Miguel Chapultepec by a treelined road reminiscent of one in Rome. Thereafter, the surrounding area became known as the "Potreros de Romita" (Pastures of Romita) and these pastures eventually lead to the naming of the colonia.

In the late 19th and early 20th centuries, the area west of what was Mexico City proper was being turned into "modern" colonias for the wealthy seeking to escape the deterioration of the city center. The colonia's height as a wealthy enclave was from its founding in the 1900s until about the 1940s. However, wealthy residents began to move to newer neighborhoods as early as the 1940s, and problems associated with urbanization began to appear in the 1950s. Older mansions began to give way to modern commercial buildings in the 1960s and 1970s as the deterioration became more serious. As the wealthy left, their houses were rented out whole or divided into smaller units, ground floors were turned into shops and offices, and the population of the northern part of the colonia fell by 41% in the 1970s alone. The 1985 Mexico City earthquake caused widespread destruction in the colonia, especially to newer and more commercial and apartment buildings, even causing one major development to mostly disappear. Roma was largely left out of the city's main post-earthquake housing program, Renovación Habitacional Popular. Since then, there have been efforts to conserve the area's architectural heritage and regain some of its former prestige with some success.

In the 2017 Puebla earthquake, the office building at Álvaro Obregón 286 collapsed, killing 49 people. From 2020, an influx of foreign remote workers, many of them American, and the spread of short-term rentals made Roma a focus of debate over gentrification. By 2024 Roma Norte had 2,571 Airbnb listings, more than any other colonia in the city, and on July 4, 2025, an anti-gentrification march passed through Condesa and Roma, during which a small group vandalized businesses.

== Geography ==
Landmarks of Colonia Roma: 1 Plaza Río de Janeiro · 2 Casa de las Brujas · 3 Plaza Luis Cabrera · 4 Fuente de Cibeles · 5 Casa Lamm · 6 Casa Universitaria del Libro · 7 Sagrada Familia Church · 8 Nuestra Señora del Rosario Church · 9 La Romita · 10 Mercado Medellín · 11 Centro Urbano Benito Juárez · 12 Casa del Poeta Ramón López Velarde · 13 MUCA Roma · 14 Museo del Objeto del Objeto · 15 Edificio Balmori · 16 Insurgentes 300 · 17 Plaza Insurgentes · 18 El Palacio de Hierro Durango · 19 Jardín Pushkin · 20 Cine Tonalá · 21 Mercado Roma · 22 Tepeji 22 (Roma house) · 23 Jardín Ramón López Velarde · 24 Jardín Edith Sánchez Ramírez. Orange M markers are Metro stations; grey bus markers are Metrobús stops. Blue lines: Avenida de los Insurgentes and Avenida Álvaro Obregón. Purple icons mark food & drink.

=== Boundaries ===
Roma's borders are:

- Avenida Chapultepec to the north, across which is the Zona Rosa, Colonia Juárez area
- Avenida de los Insurgentes to the west, across which is the Condesa district
- Eje 4 Sur Benjamin Franklin, Antonio M. Anza and Viaducto Miguel Alemán to the south, across which are Colonia del Valle and Colonia Narvarte
- Avenidas Cuauhtémoc and Jalapa to the east, across which is Colonia Doctores
- In addition, a section (Roma Norte I) lies west of Insurgentes, whose borders are Chapultepec (N), Av. Veracruz (W), Parque España/Avenida Álvaro Obregón (S)

Avenida Coahuila divides Roma into the officially recognized neighborhoods of Roma Norte and Roma Sur.

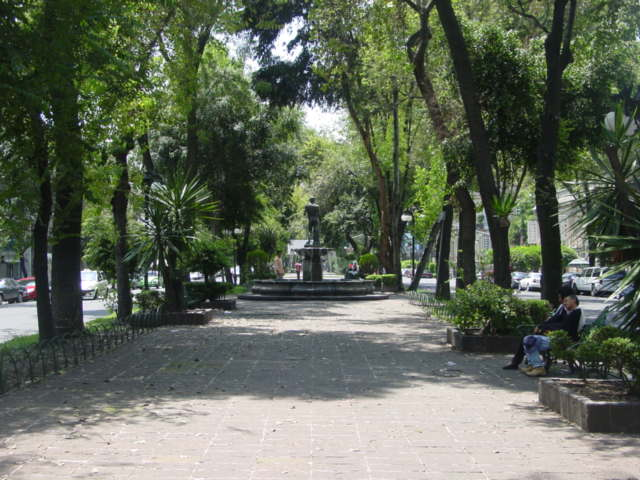
Park median in Avenida Álvaro Obregón

=== Sub-districts ===
For purposes of local administration and citizen participation, Roma Norte is divided into three officially designated territorial units: Roma Norte I (15-068), Roma Norte II (15-069) and Roma Norte III (15-070).

==== Main part east of Insurgentes ====
Roma Norte II and III, east of Avenida de los Insurgentes and north of Av. Coahuila, bisected by Roma's signature boulevard, Avenida Álvaro Obregón, is where the vast majority of the hippest restaurants, bars, clubs, etc. are found. It is home to about 1,100 mansions and other architecturally and historically important structures, mostly built between 1906 and 1939. Most of these are no longer residences but rather offices, cultural centers and other businesses. Examples of these adaptations include the Casa Lamm Cultural Center, the Casa Universitaria del Libro, the main building of the Universidad de Londres and the various art galleries which are mostly found on Colima street. In the northeast corner of this area is the pre-Hispanic village of La Romita.

==== Cibeles area west of Insurgentes ====
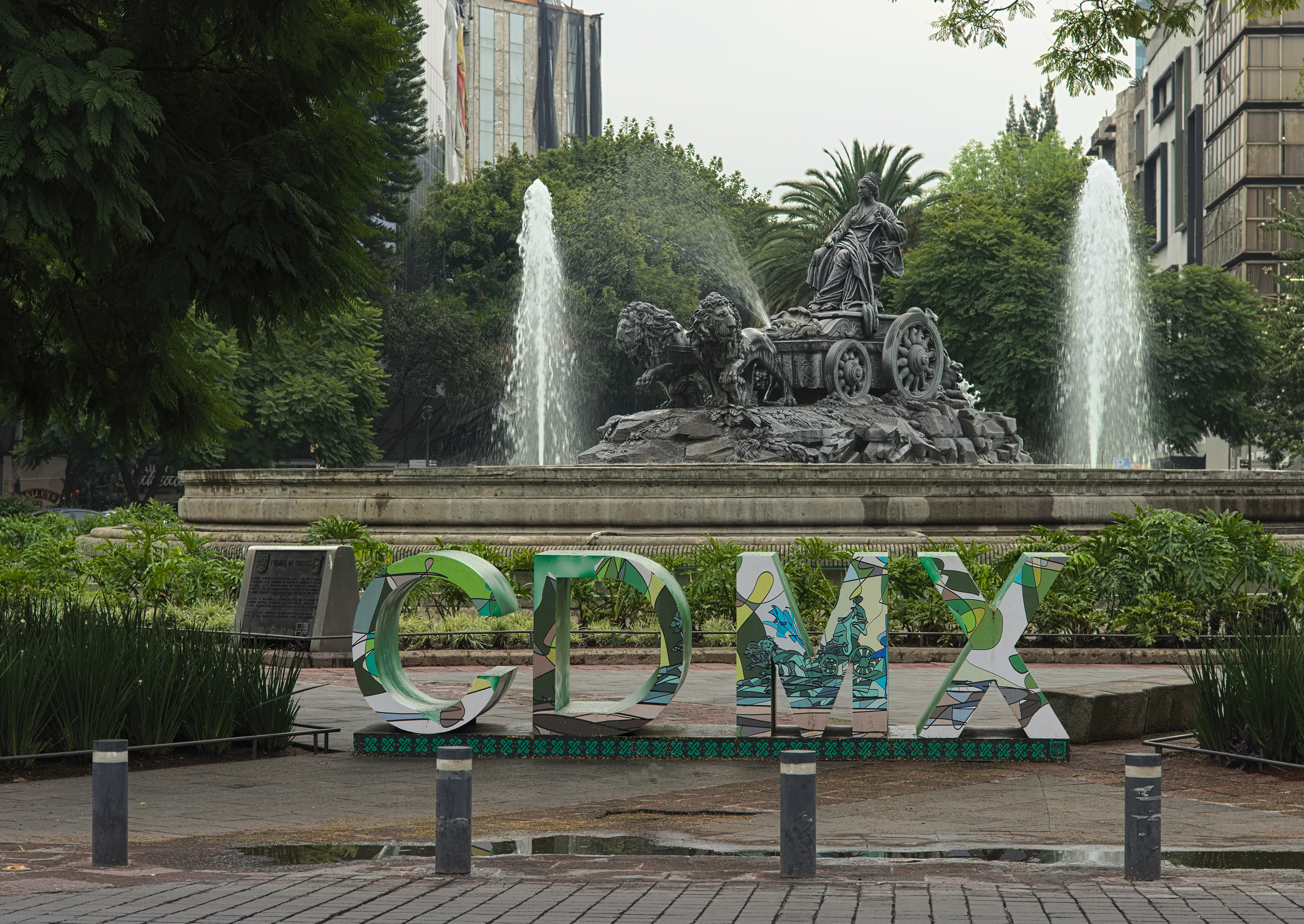
The "Cibeles" fountain

Roma Norte I is the area cut off from the main part of Roma Norte by Insurgentes Avenue on the east, sandwiched between Condesa on the south and Avenida Chapultepec on the north. It has fewer landmark buildings and is a mix of offices, restaurants, retail, and residential. The Palacio de Hierro department store Durango branch occupies a city block here and the landmark Fuente de Cibeles fountain is at the center of a major cluster of restaurants, cafés, and clubs.

===== La Romita =====
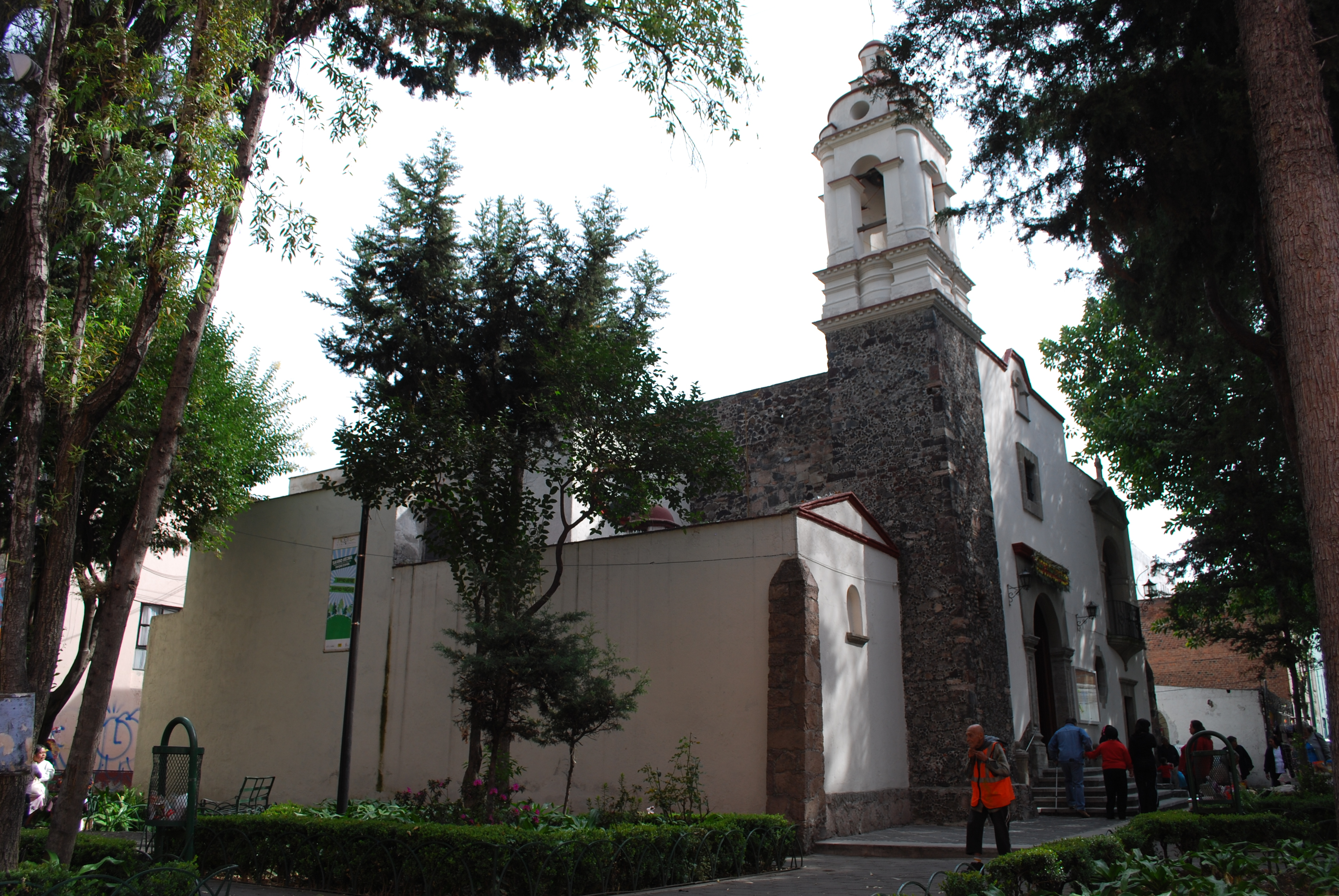
View of the Santa María de la Natividad Aztacalco church in La Romita.

La Romita is a small section of Roma, which used to be an independent village and colonia and whose streets are still significantly different from the rest of Roma. The territory of modern Colonia Roma in pre-Hispanic times consisted of the very shallow waters of Lake Texcoco and a number of very small islands of firm ground, on one of which stood the village of Aztacalco. It was an independent village until the very early 20th century, when it was made its own colonia in 1903 with the name of La Romita. When Colonia Roma was created, Romita was officially incorporated into it, but the residents fought redevelopment. The area has since developed semi-independently from the rest of Colonia Roma, both in infrastructure and socially. Even today, the area is relatively difficult to access, with narrow streets leading to a very small plaza and church called Santa María de la Natividad de Aztacalco (established in 1550). The local residents were of a significantly lower social class than the rest of Roma, with the wealthy residents avoiding it for fear of thieves. The area still has a reputation for crime and is found at the extreme northeast of the colonia near Metro Cuauhtémoc.

==== Roma Sur ====
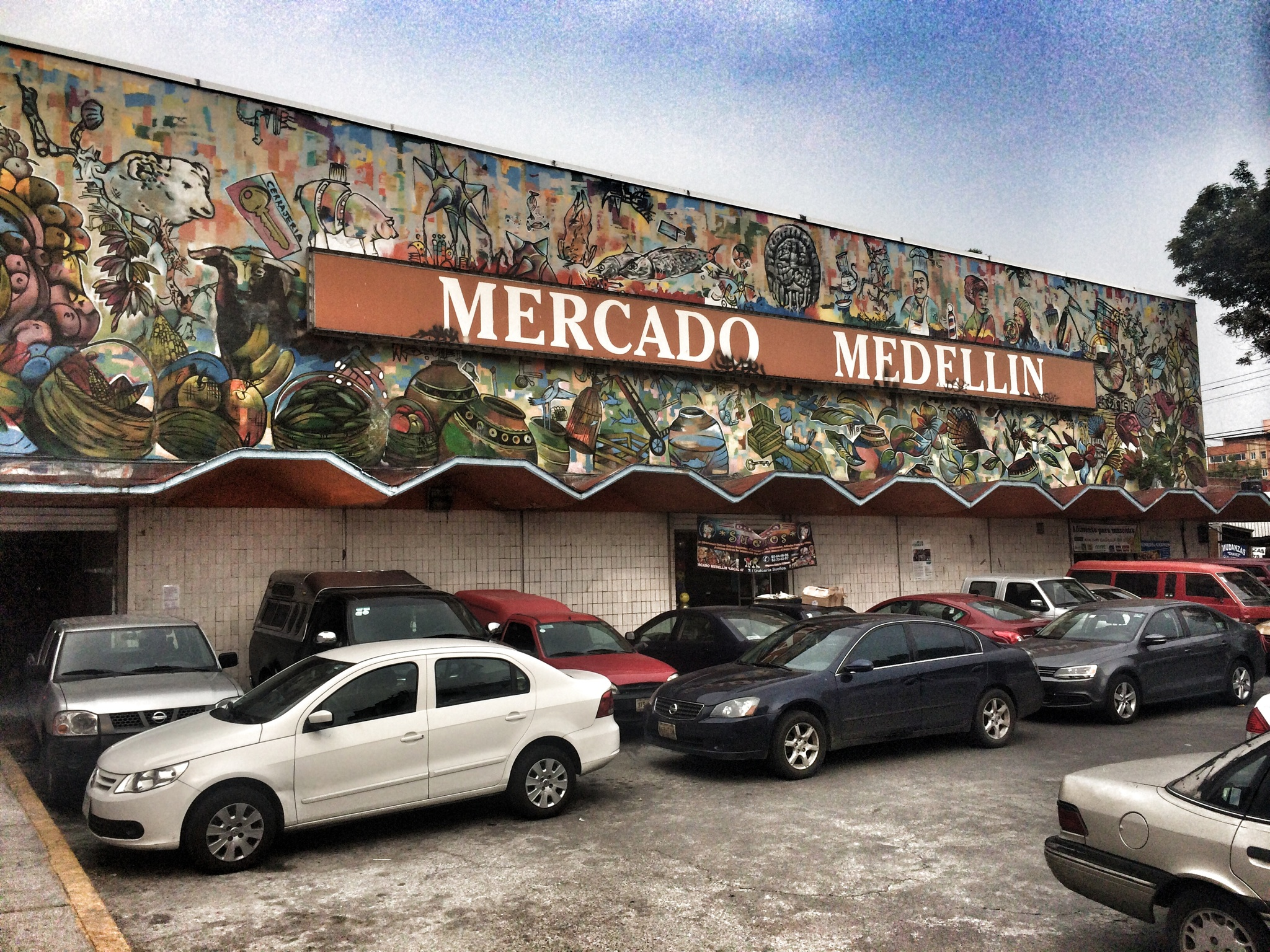
The Mercado Medellín market in Roma Sur

East of Insurgentes and south of Coahuila street, Roma Sur is much more traditional than hip Roma Norte. There are many Latin American immigrants here, plus restaurants and shops catering to them. The Mercado Medellín is located here and is famous for Latin American goods and food as well. It continues to be a predominantly residential neighborhood and has not experienced the same level of gentrification as Roma Norte. This area of the district gained international attention as a result of Alfonso Cuarón's 2018 film Roma; Cuarón lived on Tepeji Street as a child.

==== Centro Urbano Benito Juárez ====
In the far southeast corner of Roma stands the Centro Urbano Benito Juárez, or Multifamiliar Juárez, a very large apartment complex completed in the early 1950s on the site of the Estadio Nacional, a 30,000-seat stadium that opened in 1924 and was demolished in 1949. It was one of several projects of this type by architect Mario Pani, designed to house city government workers and to be semi-autonomous with its own schools, administration, businesses etc. and incorporate as much outdoors space as possible. Carlos Mérida’s mural work here was the most important of his career and the largest mural project in Mexico in the 20th century. Most of the complex and murals were destroyed by, or demolished after the 1985 Mexico City earthquake. Most of the land where the demolished buildings stood has become the Jardín Ramón López Velarde park.

=== Cityscape ===
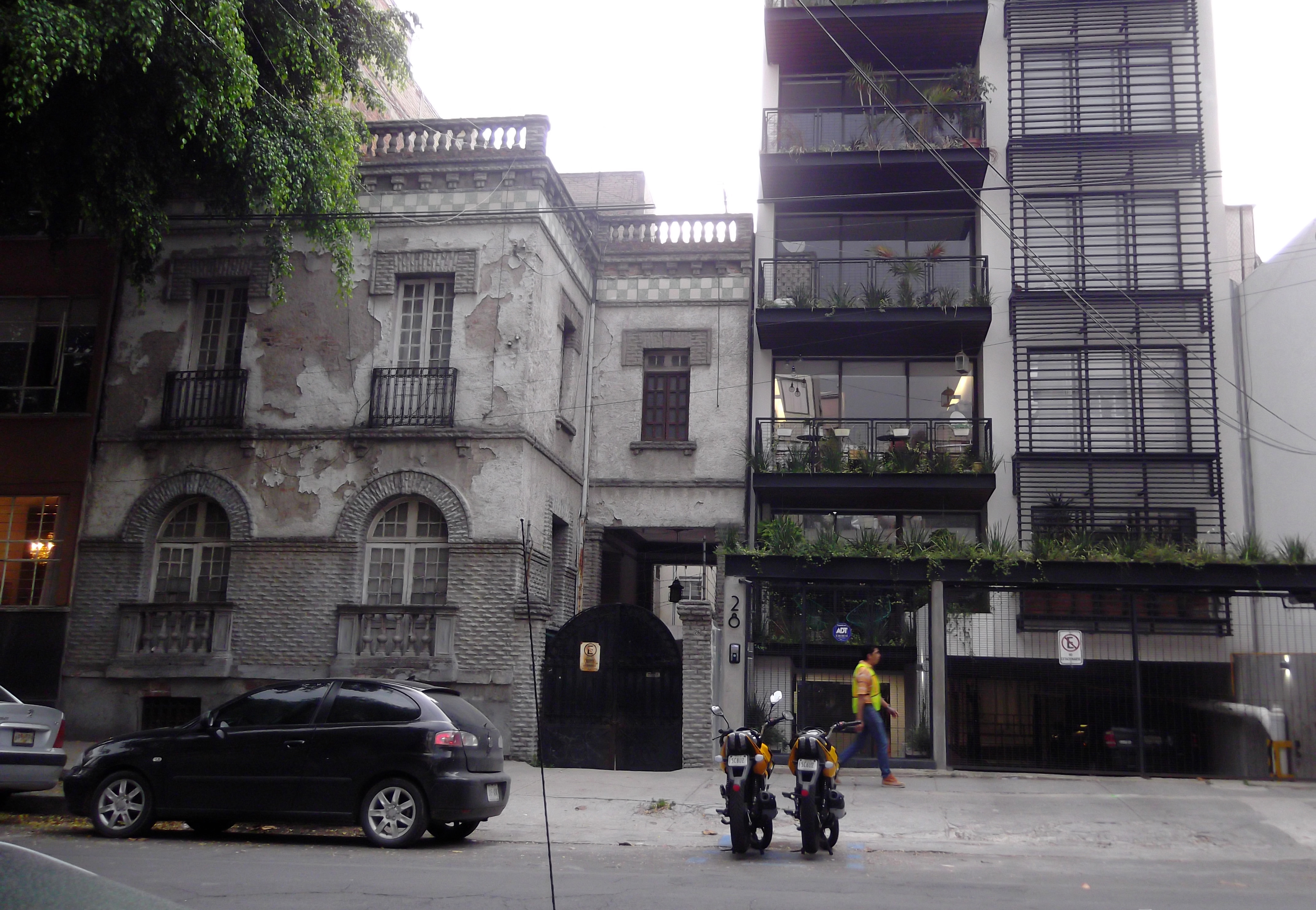
Dilapidated early 20th century home next to a modern apartment building. Roma has seen significant gentrification since the 2000s.

The colonia was an exclusive area for the wealthy on the edge of the city when it was built in the very early 20th century. Roma started to decline around the mid 20th century and was heavily affected by the 1985 Mexico City earthquake. In the 21st century, it has revived somewhat as a Bohemian area with restaurants, art galleries, offices and more. Today, the area attracts younger generations of artists, writers and urban hipsters, with rents rising once again.

Most of the streets are quiet and lined with large, leafy trees, mostly how they were laid out when the colonia was built. The largest street is Avenida Álvaro Obregón, whose traffic islands have large trees, walking paths and metal benches. On weekends, these islands fill with vendors selling art, antiques and collectibles. However, this and other of the larger streets such as Oaxaca, Querétaro and San Luis Potosí, were designated as “ejes” or axis streets in the 1950s for through traffic.

Along with the tree lined streets, green spaces were also created with the addition of small parks called plazas. The old heart of the neighborhood is the Plaza Río de Janeiro, originally called Plaza Roma. This plaza is surrounded by a number of old mansions as well as a couple a tall modern towers. In the center, there is a fountain and a replica of Michelangelo’s David. One mansion that faces this plaza is popularly called the La Casa de las Brujas (House of the Witches) although its official name is the Edificio Rio de Janeiro. The popular name of this red-brick castle-like structure, built in 1908, comes from the face that seems to be formed by the windows on the top of the corner tower and the Art Deco entrance, which was added in the 1930s. The Plaza Luis Cabrera is on the corner of Guanajuato and Orizaba Streets. It is one of the settings of José Emilio Pacheco's novella Las batallas en el desierto.

While there have been efforts to restore the area's reputation as aristocratic and upscale, the area still has problems associated with deterioration. There are a number of cabarets and men's clubs, which have attracted and sustained prostitution in the area. There are still unmaintained and abandoned buildings in which live squatters and other very poor people. In the 1990s, there was a small, poor community of about 35 Otomi in the colonia, living in abject poverty. Most earned money and depend on community soup kitchens. Most lived as squatters in abandoned buildings.

=== Architecture ===
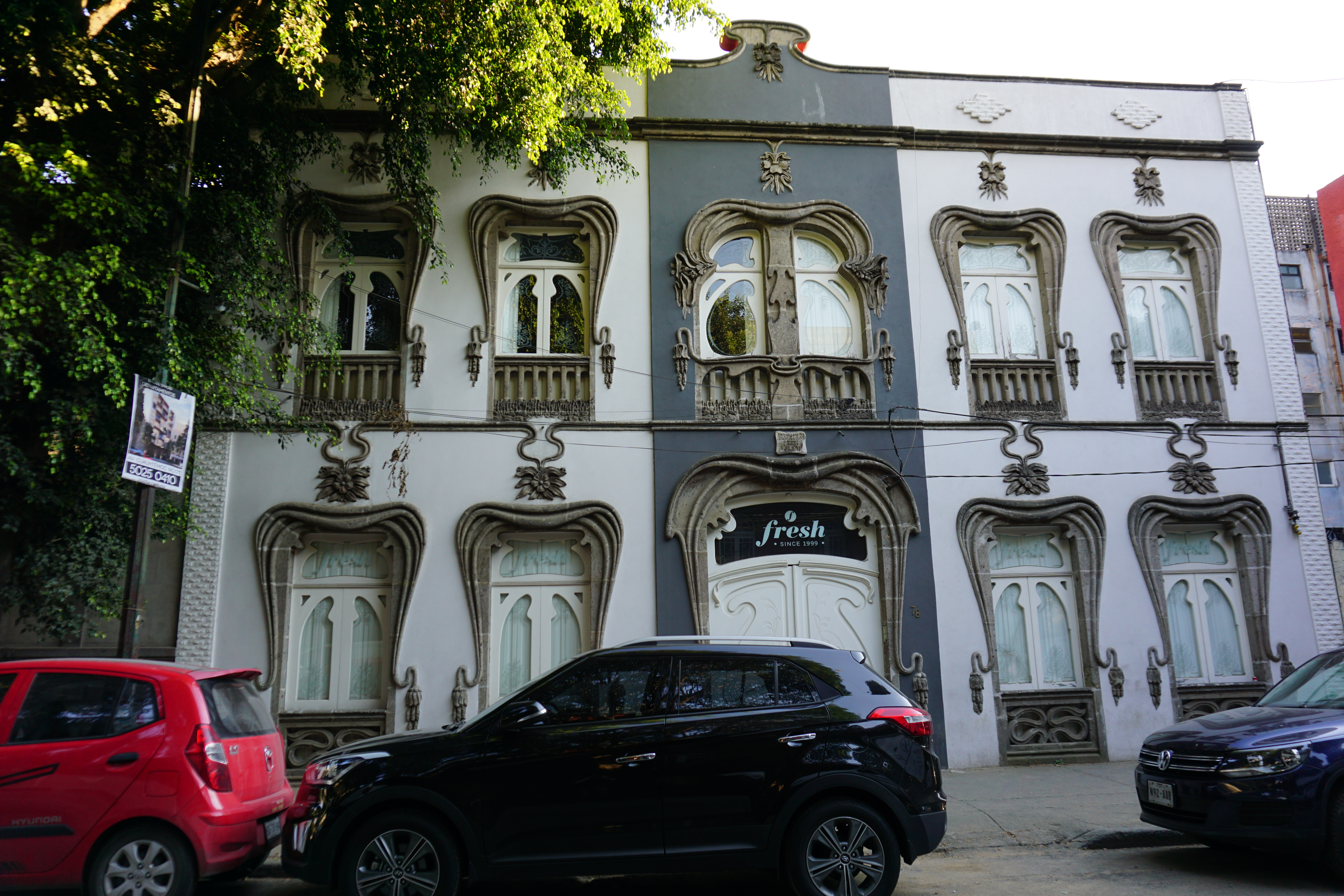
Casa Prunes, an Art Nouveau mansion

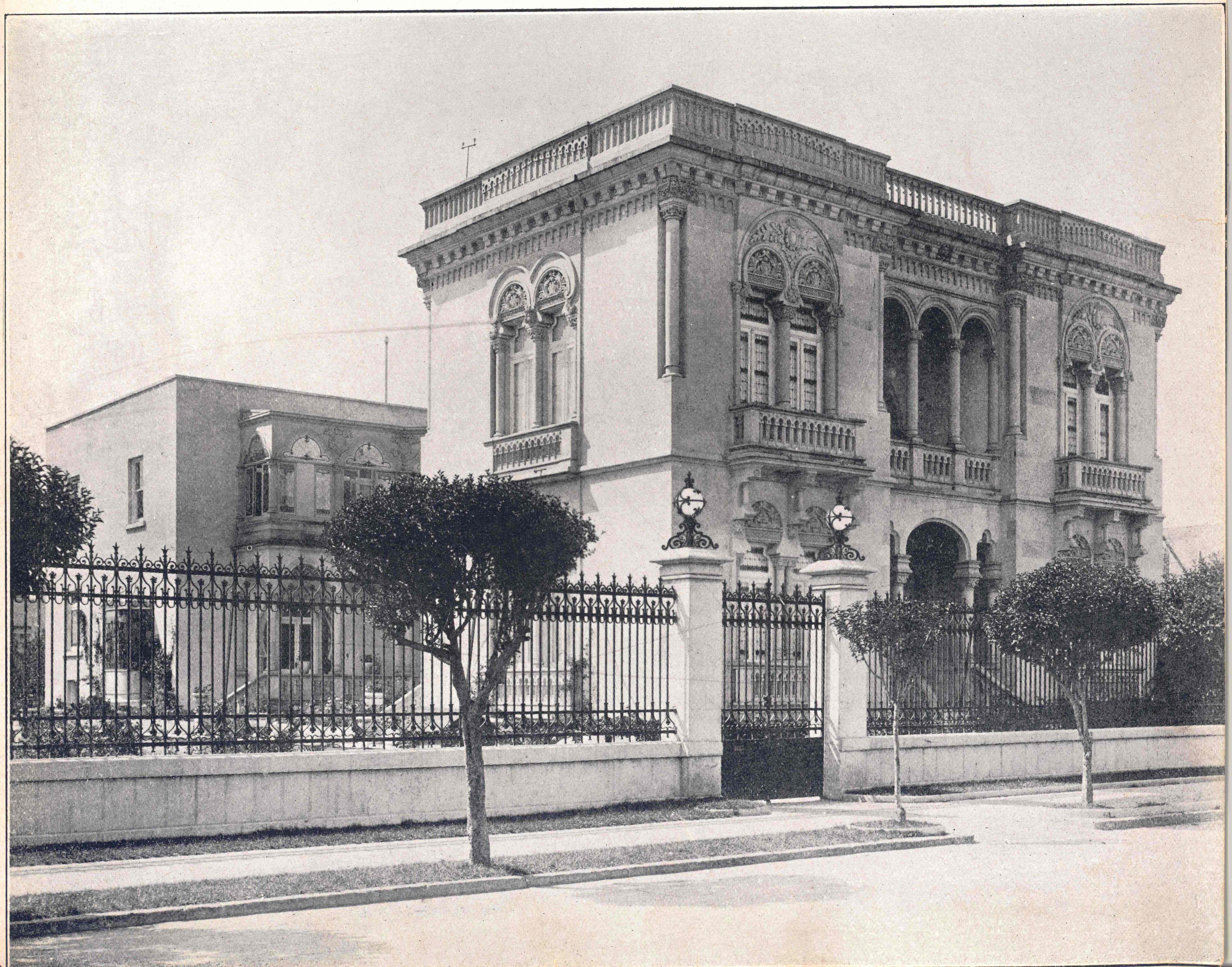
Building at Zacatecas Street 120 which currently houses the Universidad de la Comunicación.

Roma is one of a number of “modern” colonias such as Colonia Juárez, Santa María la Ribera and Colonia San Rafael, which were built on what was the western edge of the city in the late 19th and early 20th centuries for wealthy residents looking to escape the city center. The streets and houses were designed and built based on European styles, which can still be seen today, especially on Orizaba, Alvaro Obregon, Colima and Tonalá Streets, where the older facades are best conserved. These were homes of bankers, factory owners, politicians, artists and businessmen who worked in the city center but lived here. Like its sister colonias, Roma has since lost many of its original mansion homes, but it has resisted this loss better. Today, there are an estimated 1,100 structures which date from the 1930s or earlier, compared to the 500 to 600 the remain in Santa María la Ribera and Colonia Juárez. Most of the area's historically and architecturally significant structures were built between 1906 and 1939. These earlier structures include examples of Neo-colonial (which imitate the styles built during Mexico's colonial period) and Art Deco, but most are “Porfirian,” meaning that they are a mix of French, Roman, Gothic and Moorish elements which were all fashionable in the late 19th and early 20th centuries. One of these old mansions was the home of television personality Paco Stanley, who said he had bought it because of its “small friendly ghosts” and named it “La Princesita” (The Little Princess); he used it as both his home and his office. These houses and streets have provided the backdrop for films such as Los Olvidados, filmed in La Romita by Luis Buñuel and literary works such as Batallas en el desierto by José Emilio Pacheco, Agua Quemada by Carlos Fuentes, Manifestacion de Silencios by Arturo Azuela and El vampiro de la colonia roma by Luis Zapata.

One of the best-known buildings is the Edificio Río de Janeiro, popularly called the Casa de las Brujas ("House of the Witches") because the conical roof of its corner tower resembles a witch's hat. Designed by R. A. Pigeon and completed in 1908, it stands at the corner of Durango and Orizaba streets, facing Plaza Río de Janeiro; Francisco J. Serrano later remodelled it in Art Deco style. The Edificio Balmori, at Orizaba 101 on the corner of Álvaro Obregón, was built in 1922 by the engineer Ignacio Capetillo y Servín and combines Art Nouveau and Neo-Colonial elements. It housed a cinema from 1930 and, after artists and activists campaigned against plans to demolish it, was restored between 1991 and 1994. On Avenida Insurgentes, Insurgentes 300, also known as the Condominio Insurgentes, is a 19-storey commercial and residential building designed by Mario Pani.

However, the colonia now also has a large number of more modern structures, defined as having been built since the 1950s. These structures came to replace many of the original structures as the character of the colonia changed, along with the lack of urban planning, zoning and the destruction caused by the 1985 earthquake. Owners of many of the older structures have had or have wanted to demolish or radically change them for economic reasons, a process which still persists today. In cases where they have succeeded, modern office and apartment buildings have appeared. Not only are these structures taller and markedly different in design, they also weigh more, affecting the ground around them and causing damage to remaining earlier structures.

While the older mansions are no longer economically viable as residences, there has been efforts since the 1990s to save them, by converting them into offices, stores, restaurants and other businesses with restrictions aimed at conserving their facades and the colonia's overall character. Like neighboring Colonia Condesa, Roma has a number of cafes, restaurants and other eateries established in older structures (as well as newer ones), especially along Álvaro Obregón, Colima, and Orizaba streets, and on plazas Río de Janeiro and Luis Cabrera.

== Demographics ==
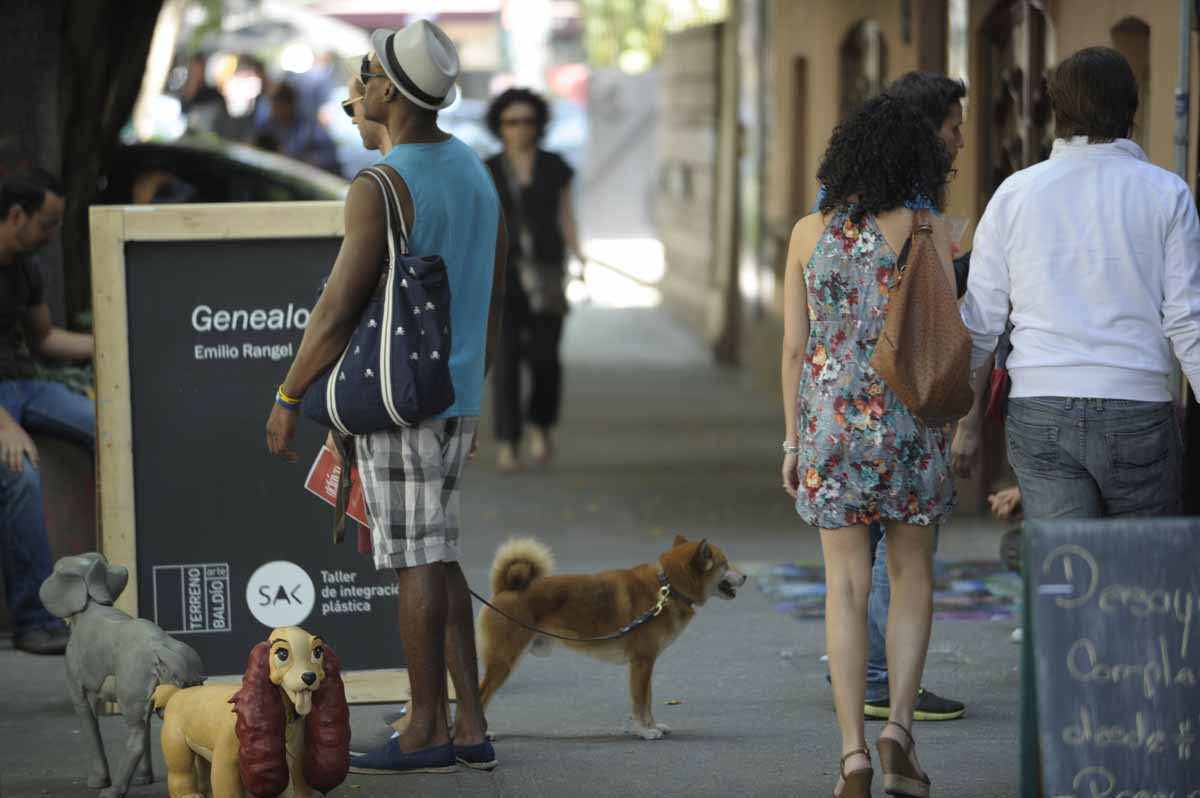
Pedestrians in Roma outside the Galería Terreno Baldío Arte

The 2010 population of Roma Norte was 27,770 and of Roma Sur 17,406. The 2000 population of Roma Norte was 26,610 and of Roma Sur 17,406.

Since the 1990s, there was a small poor community of about 35 Otomi in the colonia, living in abject poverty. Most earned money and depend on community soup kitchens. Most live as squatters in abandoned buildings.

=== Jewish community in Roma and Condesa ===
In the 1930s and 40s many Jewish residents moved from downtown Mexico City to Roma and Condesa, where Yiddish was the unofficial language of Parque España, the local park. A few synagogues are still in operation in Roma, like the Yehuda Halevi Synagogue. Today, in adjacent Condesa, there are several more small orthodox synagogues hidden inside houses on Amsterdam Avenue, and another synagogue at the corner of Montes de Oca and Parral streets. In the 1950s, 60s, and 70s, Jews moved further west to Polanco, Lomas de Chapultepec, Interlomas, Bosques de las Lomas, and Tecamachalco, where the majority are now based.

== Economy ==
Roma's economy is based on services. Many of its early 20th-century houses have been converted into restaurants, shops, galleries, offices and hotels.

=== Tourism and hospitality ===
Roma is one of the city's main areas for visitor accommodation. In March 2025, Roma Norte had 2,598 listings on Airbnb, more than any other colonia in Mexico City, and Roma Sur had 811, the seventh-highest number. The neighborhood also has a number of small boutique hotels. Of the 18 Mexico City hotels awarded a Michelin Guide Key in 2026, seven are in Roma Norte: the Brick Hotel, Casona Roma Norte, Colima 71 Casa de Arte, Ignacia Guest House, La Valise, Maison Celeste and Nima Local House.

=== Food and drink ===
Roma is one of the centers of Mexico City's restaurant scene. A 2017 analysis of INEGI business data counted just over 660 food and drink establishments in Roma Norte, the second-highest number of any colonia after the historic center. In 2024 the Michelin Guide called Roma Norte the best place to discover the city's food, noting that it had twice as many restaurants recommended by the guide as any other neighborhood.

Three restaurants in Roma hold a Michelin star: Rosetta, Elena Reygadas's restaurant on Colima Street; Expendio de Maíz, on Yucatán Avenue; and Máximo, run by chef Eduardo García. García, formerly head chef at Pujol, opened Máximo as Máximo Bistrot on November 30, 2011, at the corner of Tonalá and Zacatecas streets, and moved it to a larger space at Álvaro Obregón 65 Bis in 2020. Em, which earned a star in 2024 while on Tonalá Street, has since moved to Condesa.

Restaurants in Roma with a Bib Gourmand, the guide's award for good value, include Contramar, Gabriela Cámara's seafood restaurant on Durango Street, as well as Aleli Rooftop, Filigrana (by chef Martha Ortiz), Fugaz, Galanga Thai House, Galea, La 89, Pargot, Tacos del Valle, Tacos Los Alexis, Taquería El Jarocho, Ultramarinos Demar, Vigneron and Voraz. Restaurants listed in the guide without a distinction include Aquiles, Barbacoa Gonzalitos, Bella Aurora, Campobaja, Cariñito Tacos, Castacán, El Tigre Silencioso, Hugo, Lalo! (also García's), Lina, Lorea, Lotti, Martínez, Meroma, Migrante, Pigeon, Sarde, Sartoria, Taquería Los Parados and Xuna.

Roma also has well-known street food, such as Jenni's Quesadillas, a stand opened by Elena Rojas Vara at the corner of Mérida and Colima streets in the 1970s, and Mercado Roma, a gourmet food hall on Querétaro Street.

=== Creative industries ===
A 2016 study based on INEGI economic census data identified Roma–Condesa as one of Mexico City's thirteen creative districts, with above-average concentrations of fashion and specialized design, internet content, and film and video production, as well as architecture, interior design, market research and advertising firms. A 2019 study described the area as one of the city's greatest concentrations of cultural activity, home to publishers, architecture and design studios, film production companies, recording studios, galleries and art-house cinemas.

=== Government offices ===
The national copyright office, the Instituto Nacional del Derecho de Autor (INDAUTOR), is on Puebla Street. The Fiscalía General de la República had offices at Avenida Insurgentes 20, on the Glorieta de Insurgentes, until March 2024, when they moved to Colonia Doctores.

=== Health care ===
Roma has several private hospitals: Hospital Ángeles Clínica Londres on Durango Street in Roma Norte, and Hospital Ángeles Metropolitano on Tlacotalpan Street and Centro Médico Dalinde on Tuxpan Street, both in Roma Sur. Dalinde reopened remodelled facilities with 54 rooms and five operating rooms in 2020.

=== Shopping ===
Roma is home to free-standing Palacio de Hierro and Woolworth department stores. Enclosed malls include the Plaza Insurgentes shopping center, anchored by Sears, located on the site of the first Sears in Mexico, opened in 1947, and prior to that, the American Embassy. On Cuauhtémoc street are the Plaza Centro Cultural and Pabellón Cuauhtémoc. The large Parque Delta shopping center borders Roma on the south.

=== Public markets ===
Mercado Medellín is located in Roma Sur (southern Roma) and is well known for offering products from other Latin American countries, particularly Cuba, Colombia and Venezuela.

== Arts and culture ==
=== Art ===
Since the 1990s, commercial art galleries have clustered in Roma, particularly on Colima Street. In 1997 the magazine Business Mexico reported that dealers there, including the Landucci Gallery, hoped to build an international market for Mexican art by promoting established artists such as Francisco Toledo, Roberto Márquez and Alfredo Castaneda alongside younger ones such as Cisco Jimenez; the photographer Victor Carresquedo, the American painter Barry Wolfryd and the Centro Libre de Arte, then a new fine arts school, had also set up in the area.

Galería OMR, founded in 1983 by Patricia Ortiz Monasterio and Jaime Riestra, was based for many years on Plaza Río de Janeiro before moving a few streets away to Córdoba 100. Other art spaces include the Salón de la Plástica Mexicana, an artists' association founded in 1949 that now operates mainly from a building in Roma; Centro Cultural Border, an independent space for emerging contemporary and urban art; and Garros Galería, a gallery devoted to cats. The Casa Estudio Leonora Carrington, the former home and studio of the surrealist painter Leonora Carrington, is at Chihuahua 194.

The neighborhood also has many murals by Mexican and foreign street artists, among them D*Face, Interesni Kaski, Saner and Revost. In 2024 the artist Chavis Mármol installed Neo Ta Memes, a replica of an Olmec colossal head crushing a Tesla car, on a vacant lot in the neighborhood.

=== Stage and cinema ===
The Centro Cultural (formerly Telmex) theater complex is located in the northeast corner of Roma, while Cine Tonalá is a well-known indie/art-house cinema in Roma Sur with a sister venue in Bogotá, Colombia. Cinemex multiplex cinemas are located in three enclosed shopping centers around Roma.

The district is the namesake for the 2018 film Roma, written and directed by Alfonso Cuarón, which takes place in the neighborhood during the 1970s. Its success brought visitors to Tepeji Street, where Cuarón grew up; the house across the street, used for filming, carries a plaque reading "Aquí se filmó Roma".

=== Literature ===
The American writer William S. Burroughs lived in Roma in the early 1950s, on what is now José Alvarado Street (then Cerrada de Medellín), and on September 6, 1951, fatally shot his wife, Joan Vollmer, at an apartment at Monterrey 122. Jack Kerouac's novella Tristessa was inspired by a walk through Plaza Luis Cabrera. José Emilio Pacheco's novella Las batallas en el desierto (1980) is set in Colonia Roma around 1948.

=== Museums and libraries ===
==== Casa Lamm ====
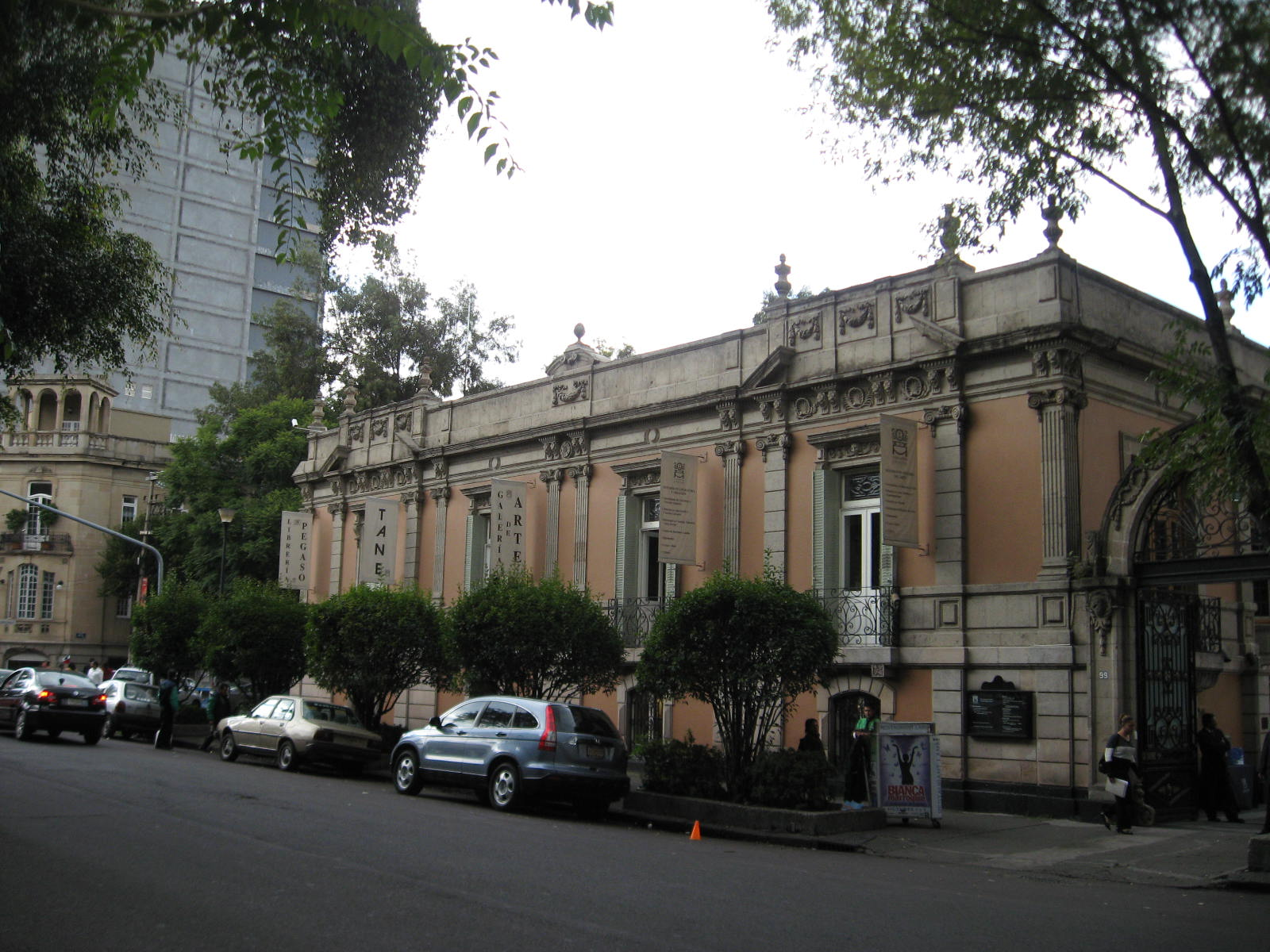
Casa Lamm Cultural Center

Casa Lamm is a cultural center and restaurant located in a restored mansion that dates to 1911 on Avenida Álvaro Obregón. The institute consists of art exhibition space and management, some graduate level programs in the fine arts and a restaurant and bookstore, which are open to the public. Since it opened, it has hosted numerous art exhibitions. In 1994, Casa Lamm, along with art galleries OMR and Nina Menocal have worked to make Roma a center for the visual arts in Mexico, attracting more galleries, artists and others to set up shop here.

The institute offers studies in poetry, novel writing and theater of the 20th century. It also offers a master's degree in Literary Appreciation and Creation, which combines both classes on criticism as well as workshops for writers mostly focusing on Latin American and European works. On the ground floor of the building, facing the street are the bookstore and restaurant. The restaurant, called "Nueve Nueve" is centered on an open-air patio accented by a black fountain.

==== Casa Universitaria del Libro ====
The Casa Universitaria del Libro (University House of Books) is located on Puebla and Orizaba Streets. The building dates from 1920, when it was built by Joaquin Barando for the McGregor family. During the Second World War it was used as the Brazilian embassy. The Centro Asturiano took possession in the 1930s. When this institution moved to Polanco in 1986, it began to lease the building free to the Universidad Nacional Autónoma de México (UNAM). Although unproven, it is still rumored that the house was used for prostitution at one point and there is also local legend which states that a ghosts wanders through its halls, rooms and especially in the terrace. The bookstore specializes in the promotion of mostly written works produced by those associated with UNAM in the center of the city away from the Ciudad Universitaria. It sponsors approximately 250 activities per year such as book readings and signings, conferences, seminars and round tables. There is no other bookstore in Mexico dedicated solely to the promotion of a university's academic and literary production.

==== Museo Objeto del Objeto ====
Museo Objeto del Objeto (Object of the Object Museum or MODO) was inaugurated in 2010, following Mexico City's tradition of collectors founding or expanding museums with their personal collections. This museum is based on the collection of ordinary objects such as commercial packaging (especially beverage containers), advertisements, household appliances and more for a total of over 30,000 items collected by Bruno Newman over more than forty years. The museum is dedicated to communication and design, using the collection as a starting point for collaboration and research.

==== Casa del Poeta Ramón López Velarde ====
The Casa del Poeta Ramón López Velarde, at Álvaro Obregón 73, is the house where the poet Ramón López Velarde lived from 1914 until his death in 1921. It was restored after being declared a historic monument and opened as a museum and cultural center in 1991; it houses the Salvador Novo and Efraín Huerta poetry libraries.

==== MUCA Roma ====
MUCA Roma, a gallery of the National Autonomous University of Mexico (UNAM) museum system, opened in 1999 at Tabasco 73 and later moved to a four-storey building at Tonalá 51.

=== Churches ===
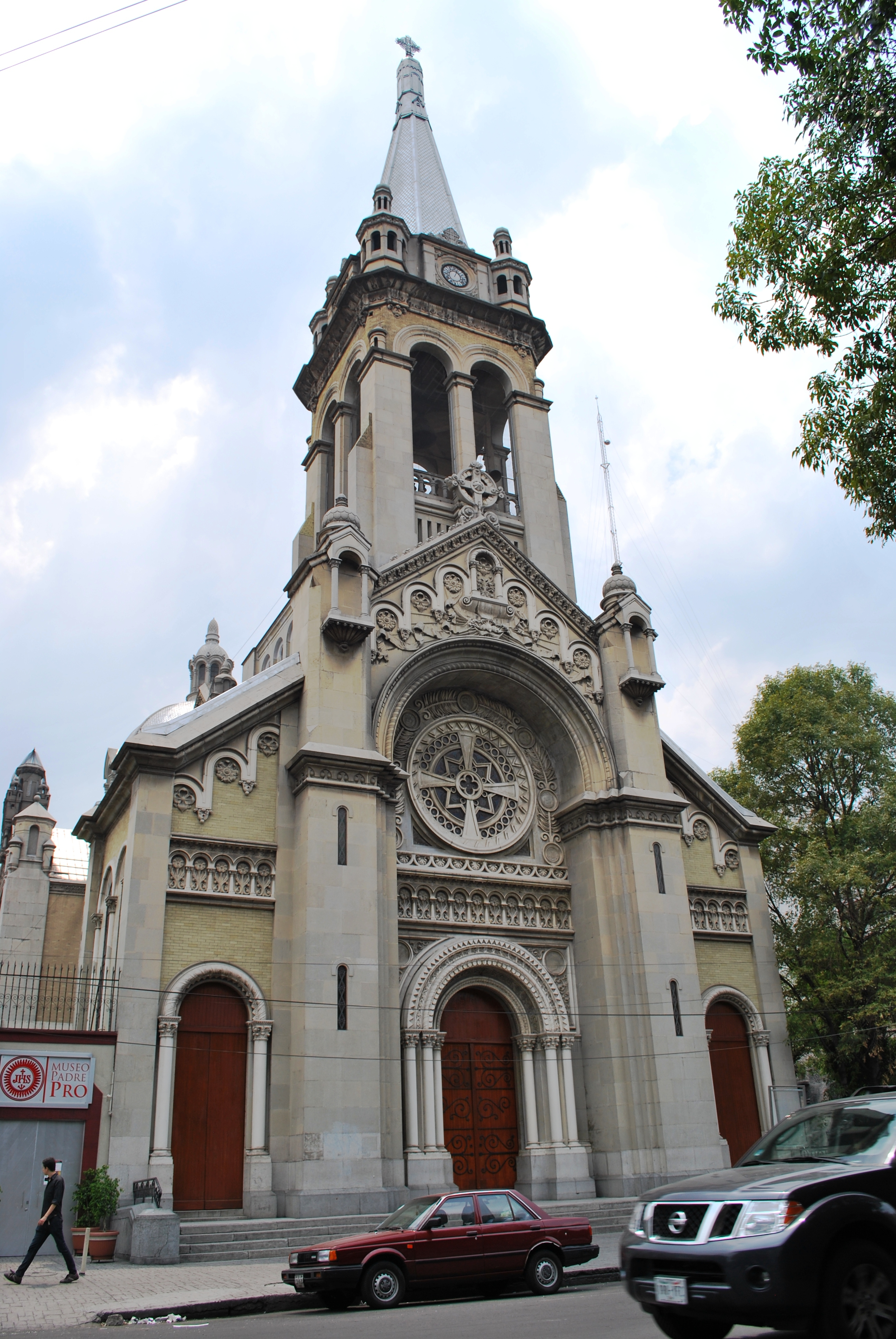
Sagrada Familia parish

The Sagrada Familia Church is located on the corner of Puebla and Orizaba Streets. Its architecture is classified as Romanesque Revival and Gothic Revival, it was designed by Mexican architect Manuel Gorozpe. The first stone was laid in 1906, but most of structure was built between 1910 and 1912, of reinforced concrete. At the time, the church was criticized as “mediocre, ostentatious and of decadent taste”. In the 1920s, painter and Jesuit priest Gonzalez Carrasco decorated the interior with murals, with two smaller paintings realized by Hermano Tapia. The interior also contains the remains of Miguel Agustín Pro, a Jesuit priest executed by Plutarco Elias Calles in 1927 during the Cristero War and considered to be a martyr. The church is fronted by a small atrium bordered by a wrought-iron fence constructed by the Gábelich workshop, which was in neighboring Colonia Doctores. It is one of the few wrought iron works to survive from the early 20th century. It is considered among the most progressive roman catholic churches in the city, holding monthly masses for the LGBT community, ecumenical events, as well as holding concerts and other cultural activities. It is also a popular church for weddings.

On Avenida Cuauhtémoc between Querétaro and Zacatecas streets is the Nuestra Señora del Rosario Church, which was built by Mexican architects Angel and Manuel Torres Torija. This church is Gothic Revival begun in 1920 and concluded in 1930. While built after the Porfirio Díaz era of the late 19th and early 20th century, the church shares many of the features as churches from that time. Records indicate that the project was probably planned around 1911 but was delayed due to the Mexican Revolution. The facade contains a decorative rose window, common to Gothic styles with ojival doors and windows. The interior is spacious with three naves with notable stained glass windows with orient themselves vertically.

== Parks and recreation ==
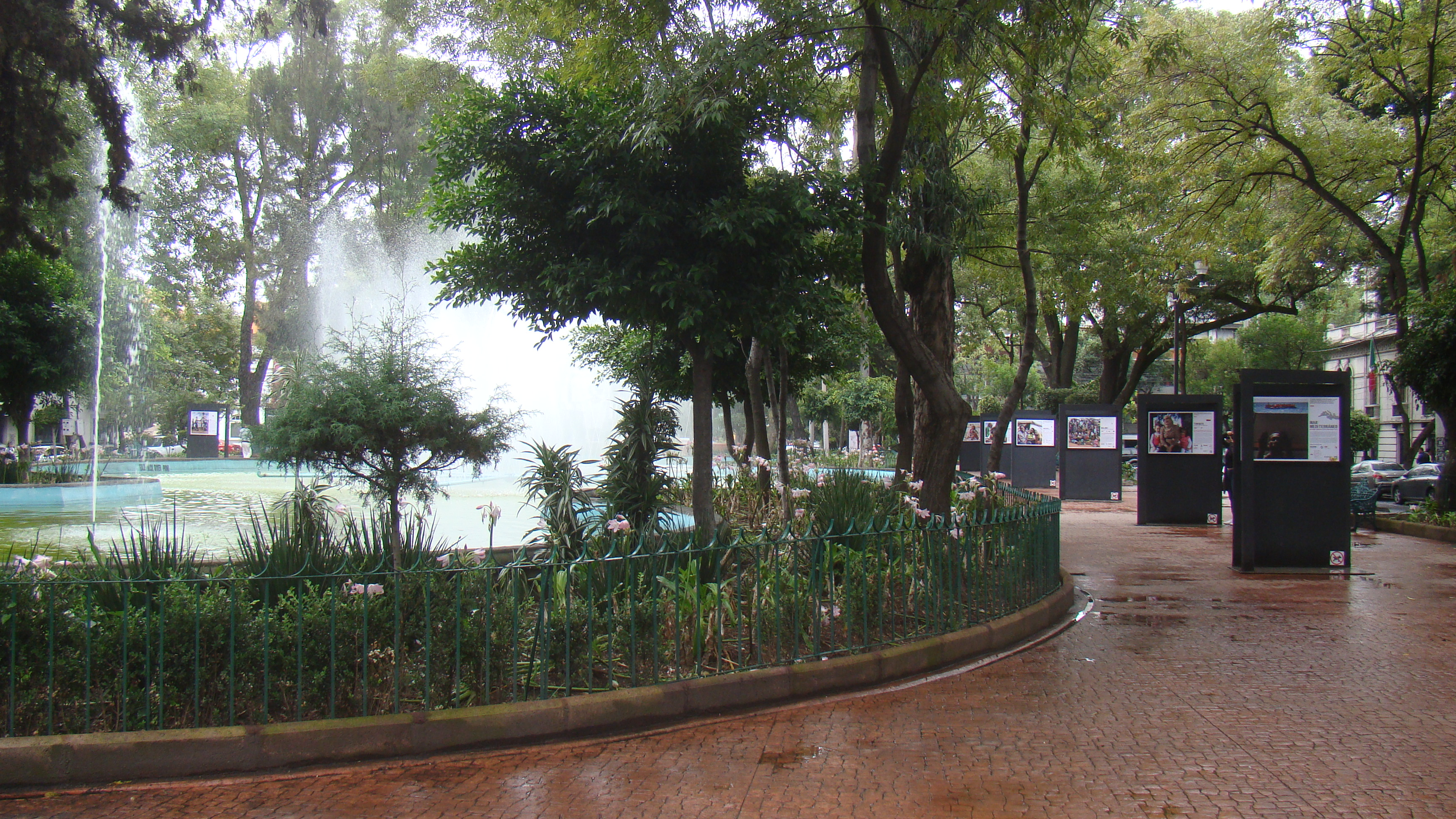
Fountains and cultural exhibition at Plaza Luis Cabrera

Plaza Río de Janeiro was planned in 1903 as Parque Roma and is also known locally as Parque Orizaba, after the street that crosses it; a bronze replica of Michelangelo's David was installed at its center in 1976. Plaza Luis Cabrera, to the south, was laid out as its mirror image and was briefly called Plaza Ajusco before being renamed after Luis Cabrera, the lawyer and politician who served as Venustiano Carranza's finance minister.

Other squares include Plaza Villa de Madrid (more commonly known as "Cibeles" as it contains the Fuente de Cibeles fountain, a replica of the one in Madrid), and tiny Plaza Juan Rulfo. Two full-size parks are Jardín Pushkin and Jardín Ramón López Velarde, while there are pocket parks at Jardín Edith Sánchez Ramírez and at the corner of Querétaro and Tonalá streets. Avenida Alvaro Obregon has a pedestrian median (camellón) lined with gardens and fountains with characters from Roman and Greek mythology.

== Education ==
In addition to the educational programs at the Casa Lamm and the Casa Universitaria del Libro, Roma has a number of private educational institutions from primary school to university. Some, such as the Instituto Pedagogico Anglo Espanol, the Instituto Renacimiento and the Colegio Mexico have been established since the first half of the 20th century.

Several universities are based in Roma. The Universidad de Londres is a mostly business college. Its main campus is in Colonia Roma, but it also has eight other facilities in other parts of Mexico City and three in other parts of Mexico. The Roma campus is housed in one of the palatial mansions from the Porfirian era on Orizaba street. It offers twenty bachelor's degrees, eight master's and eight certificate programs. The university has buildings throughout Roma, including on Guanajuato, Tabasco, Medellín, San Luis Potosí, Orizaba and Querétaro streets and on Plaza Luis Cabrera; its campus at the corner of Zacatecas and Orizaba was partly damaged by fire in April 2018.

The Universidad de la Comunicación, founded on December 13, 1976, is housed in a former residence at Zacatecas 120 and runs its own radio station and advertising agency.

The Universidad de las Américas de la Ciudad de México (UDLA) was founded in 1940 as the Mexico City Junior College (MCC). In the 1960s, its name changed to the University of the Americas and shortly thereafter to the current one. It was founded in Colonia Roma but moved to a facility on the Mexico City-Toluca highway. When the institution split in the 1980s, one campus moved to Puebla and the other moved to the current location back in Colonia Roma in newly built facilities. UDLA offers seven bachelor's degrees, four graduate degrees and various certificate programs. It is located in a modern facility on Puebla Street.

Colegio Amado Nervo is a private school in Colonia Roma Sur.

The Colegio Liceo Mexicano, a private elementary school, is in Colonia Roma. Several other small public and private school and universities exist in the area.

== Transportation ==
The neighborhood has public bus, Metrobus bus rapid transit, pesero (minibus), trolleybus and metro (subway/underground) service, as well as EcoBici bikeshare stands. Metro stations are all at the edges of the neighborhood and include Sevilla, Insurgentes, Cuauhtémoc, Centro Médico, and Chilpancingo.

Roma is bordered or crossed by several ejes viales (main crosstown arteries, mostly one-way): 1 Sur (two-way, Chapultepec), 2 Sur (eastbound, Yucatán/Querétaro/San Luis Potosí), 1 Poniente (two-way, Cuauhtémoc), 2 Poniente (northbound, Monterrey), and 3 Poniente (southbound, Yucatán/Medellín). The southern boundary of the neighborhood is the Viaducto Miguel Alemán freeway.
