= Estadio Nacional =

Estadio Nacional (National Stadium in Spanish) is the name used for:

- Estadio Nacional de Hockey in Quilmes, Buenos Aires, Argentina
- Estadio Nacional Julio Martínez Prádanos in Santiago, Chile
- Estadio Nacional de Costa Rica (1924) in La Sabana, Costa Rica
- Estadio Nacional de Costa Rica (2011) in La Sabana, Costa Rica
- Estadio Nacional (Mexico) (demolished), formerly located in Colonia Roma, Mexico City, Mexico
- Estadio Nacional de Panamá in Panama City, Panama
- Estadio Nacional (Lima) in Lima, Peru; nicknamed Coloso de José Díaz
- Estadio Tiburcio Carías Andino, in Tegucigalpa, Honduras
- Estadio Nacional Soberanía, in Managua, Nicaragua

In Portuguese, Estádio Nacional (National Stadium) is used for:

- Estádio Nacional in Jamor, Portugal near Lisbon
- Estádio Nacional Mané Garrincha in Brasília, Brazil
