= Universidad de Londres =

Private university in Mexico City and Querétaro

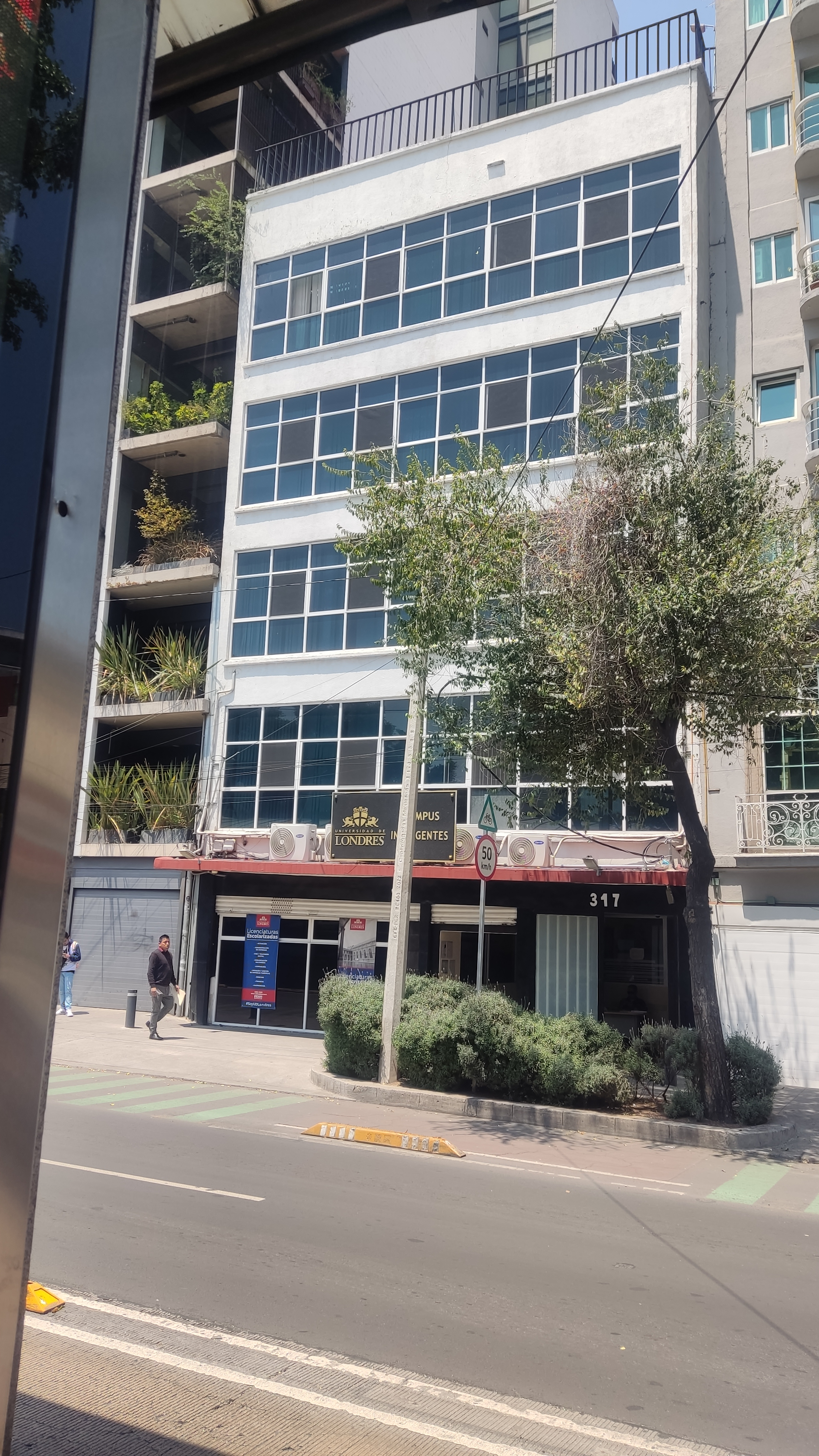
- The Insurgentes campus on Avenida de los Insurgentes, Roma Norte
- Motto: Formar para la vida
- Motto in English: Educating for life
- Type: Private
- Established: 1980
- Affiliations: FIMPES
- Location: Mexico City and Querétaro City, Mexico
- Campus: Urban
- Website: udlondres.com

The Universidad de Londres (Spanish for "University of London"; often abbreviated UDL or UDLondres) is a private university in Mexico City, with a separate branch in Querétaro City. Founded in 1980, it teaches at upper-secondary (preparatoria), undergraduate and master's level. Most of its Mexico City buildings are in Roma Norte, and it has one campus in the neighbouring Colonia Doctores. Its preparatoria is incorporated into the National Autonomous University of Mexico (UNAM).

== History ==
The university was founded in 1980. (Note: The education guide Miuni names Gabriela de la Vega as the founder and says the institution grew out of the purchase of an existing school, the Instituto London.) Gabriela de la Vega y Vega was its rector in 2011 and 2015. The preparatoria holds UNAM incorporation number 1244, under agreement 79/83.

In October 2011 the university opened its Vértiz campus in Colonia Doctores, in a group of buildings from the early 20th century. According to the university, the neo-Gothic complex had been built under the supervision of the engineer Miguel Ángel de Quevedo and had served over the years as an asylum for the elderly, an orphanage, a prison and a school. About 500 people attended the opening ceremony on 21 October 2011, which was held in the former chapel, converted into an auditorium.

The Querétaro branch opened in 2003. In 2015 the university signed an agreement, "Somos jóvenes y seremos mejores", with Mexico City's Secretariat of Rural Development and Equity for Communities, under which students of business administration, marketing, gastronomy, nutrition and fashion design trained small producers and artisans as part of their internships and social service. In 2017 the Querétaro branch, then led by rector Ivonne Wiener Bercovich, renewed an agreement with the state's Colegio de Bachilleres (COBAQ) that gave the college's students automatic admission and a 60 per cent tuition discount.

On the night of 25 April 2018 a fire, reportedly caused by a short circuit, broke out in a maintenance store at the Luis Cabrera campus; no one was injured. The university's Roma campus has served as a venue for the COMIPEMS upper-secondary entrance examination.

== Campuses ==
The Luis Cabrera campus, Plaza Luis Cabrera 9

Campuses listed by the university
City	Campus	Neighbourhood	Address	Notes
Mexico City	San Luis Potosí	Roma Norte	San Luis Potosí 154	Preparatoria; admissions office
Mexico City	Luis Cabrera	Roma Norte	Plaza Luis Cabrera 9	At the corner of Orizaba and Zacatecas streets; admissions office
Mexico City	Vértiz	Doctores	Calle Dr. Velasco 73	Opened 2011 in a former asylum; admissions office
Querétaro	Juárez	Centro Histórico	Av. Universidad 5 and 9 Pte.	
Querétaro	Ezequiel Montes I	Centro Histórico	Av. Universidad 119 Pte.	
Querétaro	Ezequiel Montes II	Centro Histórico	Av. Universidad 121 Pte.	
Querétaro	Hotel-escuela	Juriquilla	Blvd. Villas del Mesón 56	Teaching hotel

== Academics ==
In Mexico City the university offers a three-year preparatoria with morning classes, sixteen full-time bachelor's degrees, including acting, film and digital television, fashion design, gastronomy, law, nutrition, psychology and information technology, and a set of weekend "executive" bachelor's degrees for working students. Its master's programmes cover business administration, human resources, corporate law, coaching, teaching, special education, finance, IT management, legal and forensic dentistry, and family and psychoanalytic psychotherapy. It also offers some bachelor's and master's degrees online. The university describes itself as certified by the Federación de Instituciones Mexicanas Particulares de Educación Superior (FIMPES). In 2026 it was one of about forty FIMPES member institutions offering scholarships to applicants who had sat the UNAM admission process, with 100 half-tuition places.

The Querétaro branch describes its mission as education in "seven steps": knowing, accepting, caring for, loving and improving oneself, in order to pass this on and transform society.

== Gallery ==
Luis Cabrera campus, front

Luis Cabrera campus, corner

Main entrance

Entrance pavilion

Side loggia, with a plaque reading "M. L. Stampa, Ingeniero Civil, 1923"

Arcade detail
