= Baseball at the 1926 Central American and Caribbean Games =

- Venue: Estadio Nacional
- Competitors: 34 from 2 nations
- Teams: 2

Medalists
gold medal	Cuba
silver medal	Mexico

Baseball was contested at the 1926 Central American and Caribbean Games in Mexico City, Mexico, between teams representing Mexico and Cuba. Guatemala, the third nation participating in the games, did not send a baseball selection to the tournament.

The baseball tournament at the 1926 Games was the first appearance of both Cuba and Mexico international baseball scene. Although ad-hoc international baseball exhibitions had previously been played, historian Peter C. Bjarkman described the 1926 baseball events as "the first international baseball tournament of any legitimacy."

The competition consisted of a three game series, where Cuba defeated Mexico 12–0 in the first game, 10–3 in the third game and 8–2 in the third game to claim the gold medal; Mexico was awarded the silver medal.

== Participating nations ==
A total of two countries participated. The number of athletes a nation entered is in parentheses beside the name of the country.

- Cuba (17)
- Mexico (17)

== Medalists ==
The Cuban team was made up of players from the country's amateur league, mostly from the powerhouse Vedado Tennis Club team. The rest of the roster was composed of players from the Police, Havana Yacht, Loma Tennis, and University of Havana clubs. The team, managed by Horacio Alfonso, was so strong that it managed to defeat an all-star team of players from the professional Cuban Winter League in an exhibition before leaving Havana.

Event	Gold	Silver	Bronze
Men's baseball	Cuba; Miguel Aguilera; Gustavo Alfonso; Joaquín Calvo; Antonio Castro; Antonio Casuso; Alfredo Consuegra; Jorge Consuegra; José Echarri; Porfirio Espinosa; Cándido Hernández; Rafael Inclán; Tomás Minguillón; Silvio O'Farrill; Roberto Puig; Bernardo Rodríguez; Pedro Ruiz; Camilo Vietti	Mexico; R. Ampudia; Eduardo Ampudia; Reyna; Rómulo Carrasco; Cantú; García; Sarabia; González; Ortega; Enrique Pinedo; Stoopen; Herrera; Mirabete; Anzures; Becerril; Aranda; Castro	Not awarded

== Round robin ==
Pos	Team	Pld	W	L	RF	RA	RD	PCT	GB
1	Cuba	3	3	0	30	5	+25	1.000	—
2	Mexico (H)	3	0	3	5	30	−25	.000	3

Source: Centro Caribe Sports
(H) Hosts

Estadio Nacional
Team	1	2	3	4	5	6	7	8	9	R	H	E
Cuba	0	3	0	0	1	4	1	0	3	12	15	1
Mexico	0	0	0	0	0	0	0	0	0	0	5	3

Estadio Nacional
Team	1	2	3	4	5	6	R	H	E
Cuba	0	0	2	8	0	0	10	11	0
Mexico	0	0	0	3	0	0	3	5	2

Estadio Nacional
Team	1	2	3	4	5	6	7	8	9	R	H	E
Cuba	0	0	1	1	0	0	4	2	0	8	10	2
Mexico	0	0	0	0	2	0	0	0	0	2	3	3

== Statistical leaders ==
Statistic	Name	Total
Batting average	(Cuba) Joaquín Calvo	.714
Hits	(Cuba) Joaquín Calvo	5
Runs	(Cuba) Cándido Hernández	6
Home runs	(Cuba) José Echarri	1
Home runs	(Cuba) Cándido Hernández	1
