= Jardín Ramón López Velarde =

Park funding and deterioration

Coordinates: 19.410°N 99.156°W

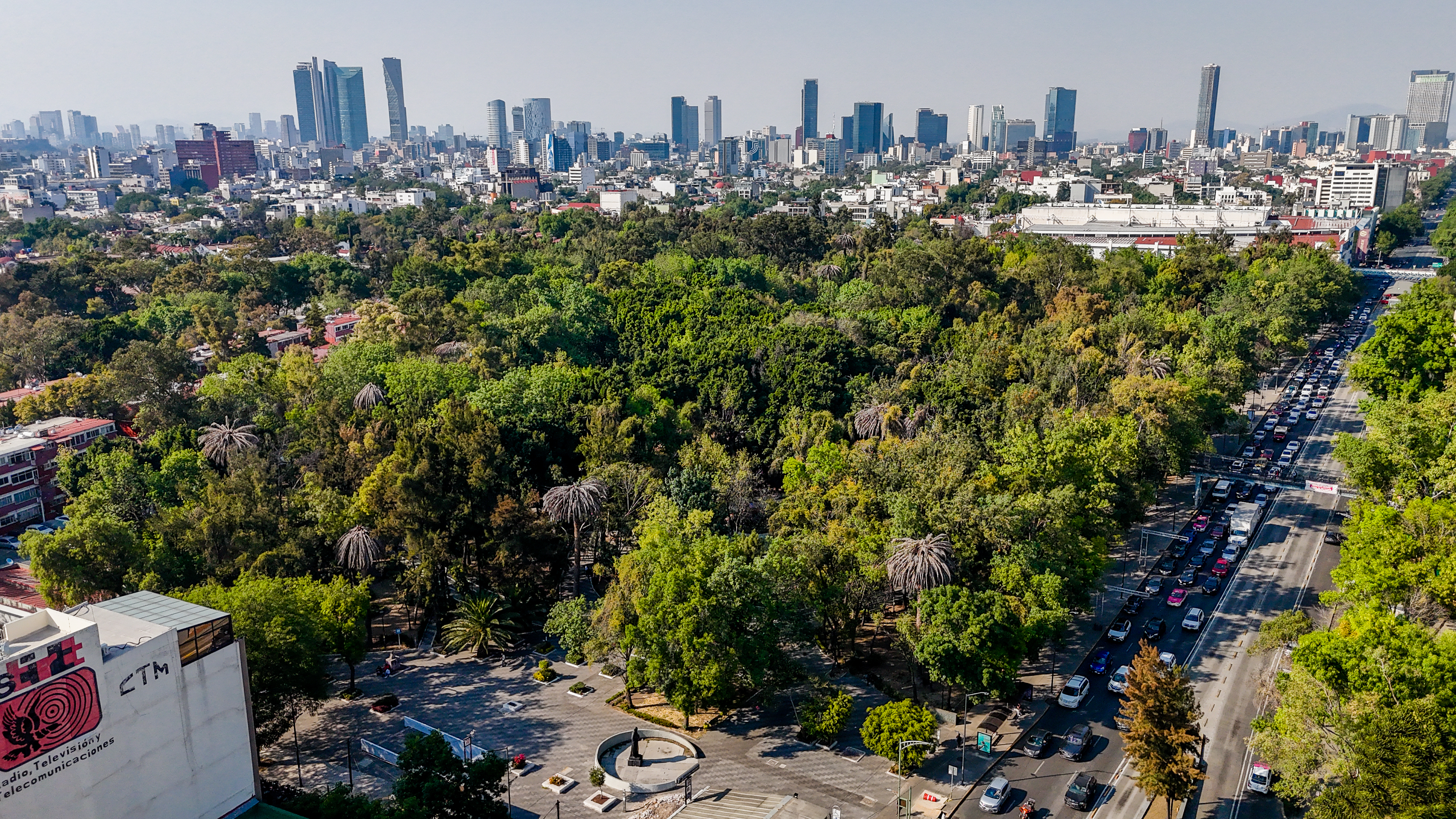
Jardín Ramón López Velarde, 2025

Jardín Ramón López Velarde (Ramón López Velarde garden) is a park in Mexico City in the southeast corner of Colonia Roma Sur in front of the Centro Médico Nacional Siglo XXI medical center. It is built where the Estadio Nacional stadium (1923–1949) once stood and later public housing (1949–1985) which was damaged during the 1985 Mexico City earthquake. The park was in a deteriorated state due to lack of maintenance from the borough, but in 2014, 4 million pesos were assigned to rescue the park.
