= Insurgentes 300 =

Coordinates: 19.4141938°N 99.1653990°W

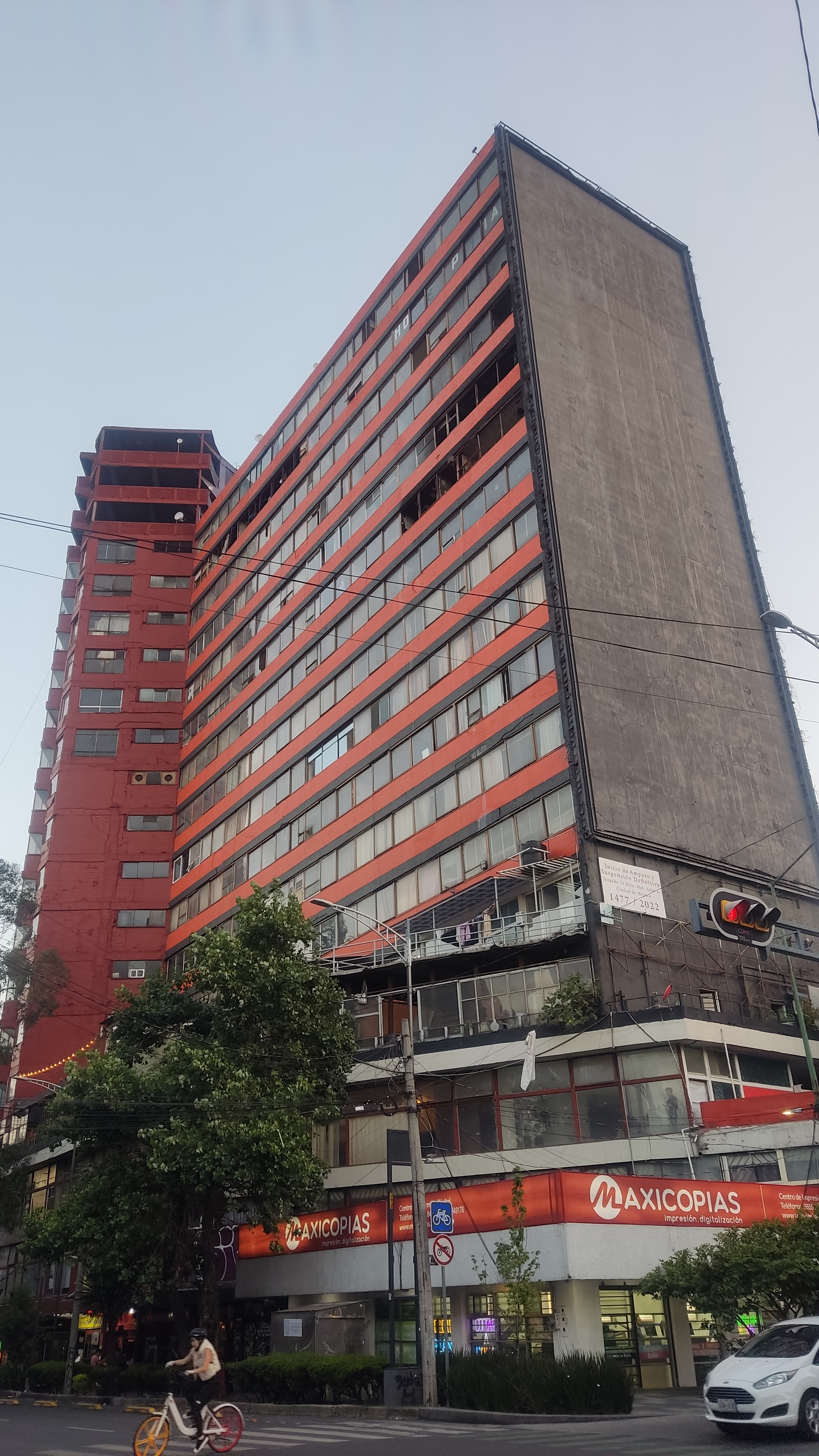
- The building in 2023

General information
- Type: Commercial and residential
- Location: Colonia Roma, Mexico City, Mexico

Insurgentes 300, also known by its official original name, Condominio Insurgentes, or also as Edificio Canada, is a 19-floor commercial and residential building at Avenida de los Insurgentes 300, Colonia Roma, Mexico City. it is a work of noted Mexican architect Mario Pani.

== History ==
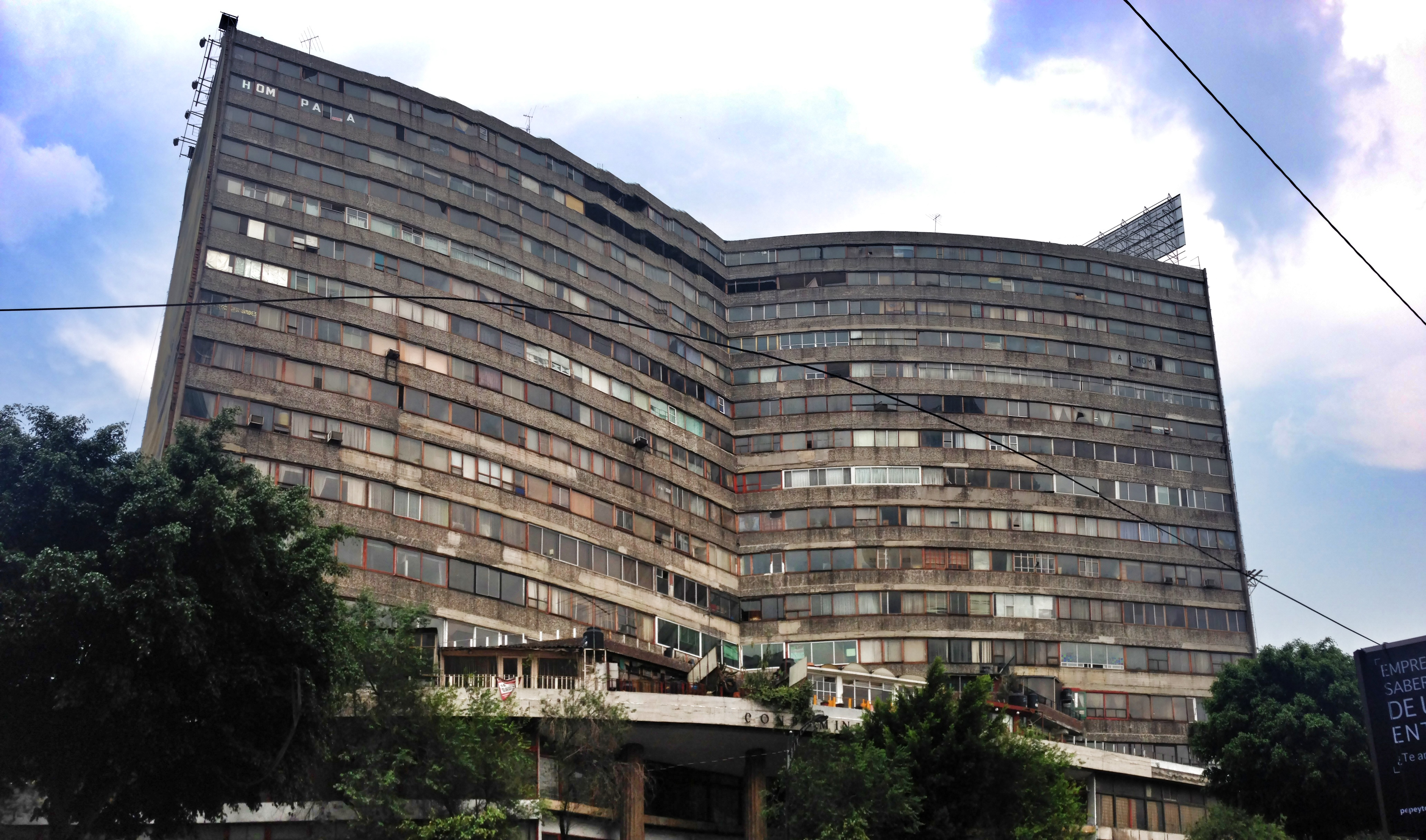
The building in 2013

The building obtained its building permit in 1956, and opened in 1958, being one of the first tall condominiums in Mexico, with an elevator bank and a heliport. It was a prestigious address, and lawyers' and actors' offices were located there. The building's side carried the letters of the giant advertisement "CANADA".

In 1995, Judge Abraham Antonio Polo Uscanga (de) was assassinated here.

In 2006, plastic artist Ramiro Chávez made an exhibit with the letters from the "CANADA" advertisement once they were taken down, which was shown at the Museo Carrillo Gil.

After the March 2012 Guerrero–Oaxaca earthquake, the building was damaged and on August 17 of that year the Secretariat of Civil Protection of the Mexican Federal District ordered the complete evacuation of the building, which at the time still had 78 of its 420 offices occupied.

As of October 2013, some renovation and reinforcement work is going on in the building but it is not clear if these are enough to allow the building's reopening.
