= La Romita =

Neighborhood in Colonia Roma, Mexico City, Mexico

Coordinates: 19°25′23.25″N 99°9′18.91″W

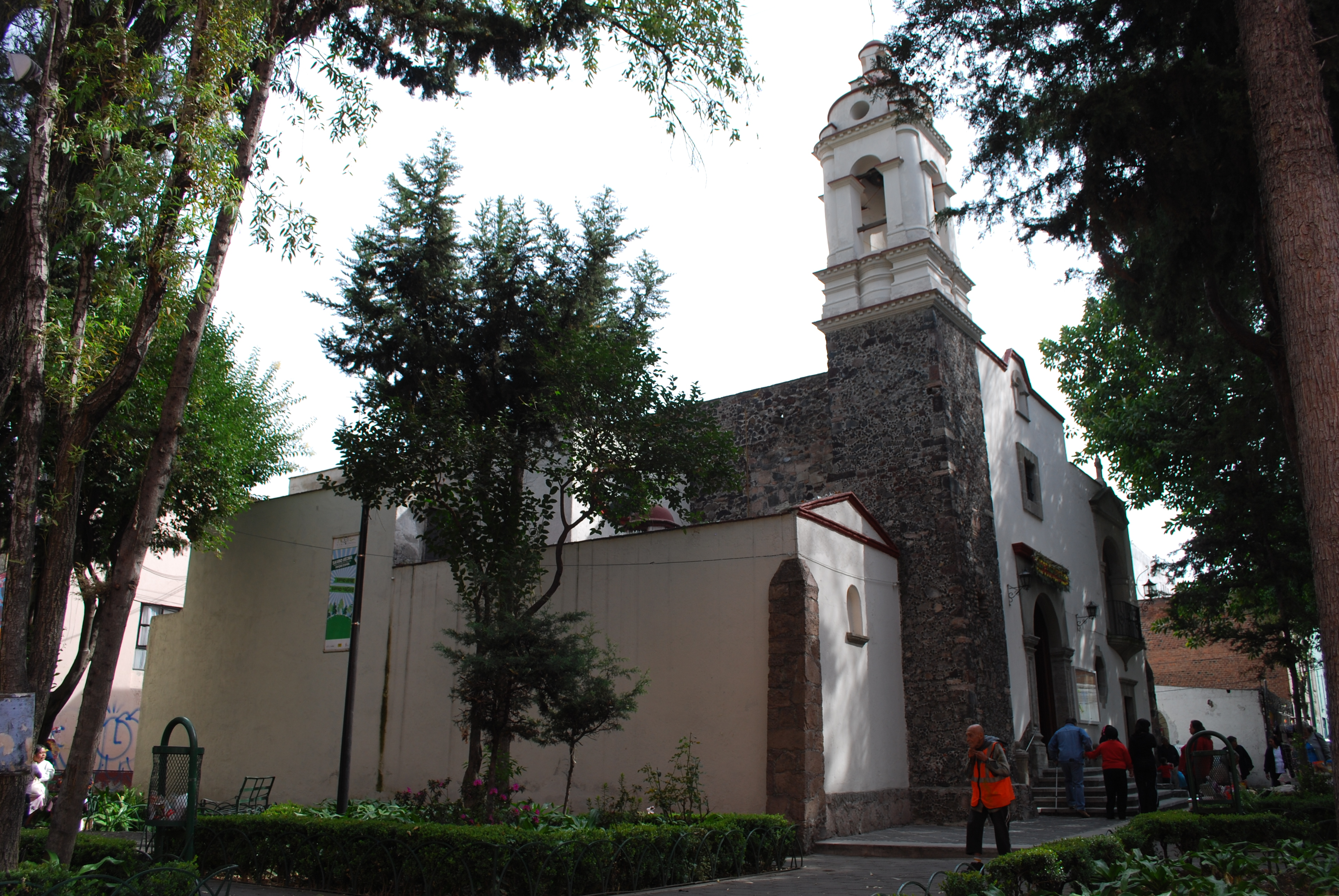
View of the Santa María de la Natividad Aztacalco church

La Romita is a small neighborhood located in the Colonia Roma section of Mexico City. The area began as an independent pre Hispanic village called Aztacalco, later renamed Romita. When the area around the village was redeveloped into housing for the wealthy, the village resisted and remained separate socially although officially part of Colonia Roma. During the 20th century the area had a reputation for being dangerous as it residents were relatively poor. Today, the area is no longer poor or dangerous, but its streets are narrower than the rest of Colonia Roma and its residents still consider themselves distinct.

== History ==
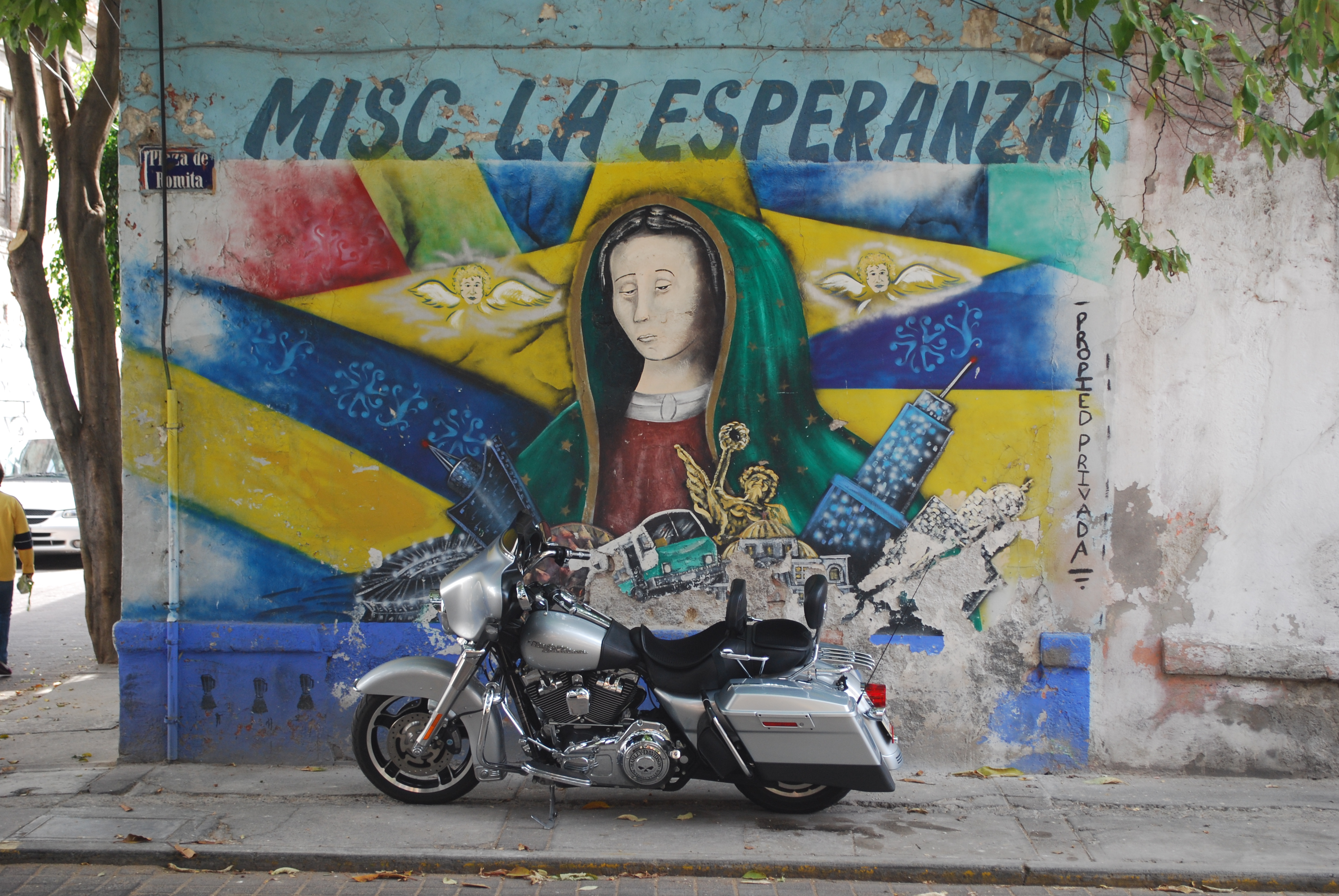
Mural of the Virgin of Guadalupe with Harley Davidson motorcycle next to the main plaza

La Romita began as a pre Hispanic village that remained independent until the establishment of Colonia Roma and has remained semi-independent since. In the pre Hispanic period, the area was a small island called Aztacalco located near the Aztec capital of Tenochtitlan surrounded by the shallow waters of Lake Texcoco. The name means "in the house of herons." After the Spanish conquered Tenochtitlan, renaming it Mexico City, Aztacalco was one of the areas that the indigenous were permitted to continue living.

During the colonial period the village continued to be independent although its status as an island disappeared along with the waters of the lake. By the mid 18th century, a road connecting Mexico City and Chapultepec passed nearby and due to its many trees was named La Romita as it resembled an avenue in Rome, Italy. The village began to be called Romita as well with this name appearing in written records in 1752.

According to local lore, in the colonial period thieves caught in Tepito were hung here using the large Montezuma cypress trees that the area had, which became something of a spectacle. The now dry land became hacienda generally dedicated to the raising of horses.

In the late 19th century and early 20th century, Mexico City was growing westward over these formerly rural areas. In 1903, the hacienda land around Romita was bought with the purpose of creating a housing development for the wealthy called Colonia Roma. The hacienda immediately surrounding Roma became the streets of Puebla, Durango, Morelia and Avenida Cuauhtémoc. When Colonia Roma was created, Romita was officially incorporated into it, but the local residents fought redevelopment. The area has since developed semi-independently from the rest of Colonia Roma, both in infrastructure and socially.

The local residents were of a significantly lower social class than the rest of Roma, with the wealthy residents avoiding it for fear of thieves. In the 20th century, it was also the home of a notable pulque bar called La Hija de los Apaches located on Avenida Cuauhtemoc. In the 1930s and 1940s, the area had two legendary female thieves named Plácida Hernández and the other only referred to as "La Loba" (The She-Wolf) . The area had one famous gang known as the Halcones (Falcons). This gang was prominent in the 1940s and 1950s, when it was led by Arturo "El Negro" Durazo and controlled a large part of La Romita. Durazo befriended and protected a more studious resident of the area, José López Portillo, who eventually went into politics and became president of Mexico from 1976 to 1982. In return for protection received when he was young, Portillo made Durazo the chief of police of Mexico City. This led wide scale corruption and brutality until Durazo was replaced and jailed by the following president Miguel de la Madrid .

The area's former reputation as dangerous was noted in a number of stories. The protagonist of the novel Las Batallas en el Desierto, written by José Emilio Pacheco, talks about the thieves of Romita and the fear he had of the neighborhood. Los Olvidados was partly filmed here in the 1940s especially the scene where an indigenous boy named El Ojitos is abandoned by his father at the church.

Today, the neighborhood is no longer considered to be dangerous and is now considered to be a cultural center as the home where Gilberto Rincón Gallardo lived at La Romita #8 has been rehabilitated as a cultural center. Also its residents still consider themselves distinct from the rest of Colonia Roma even though they are no longer poor.

== Geography ==
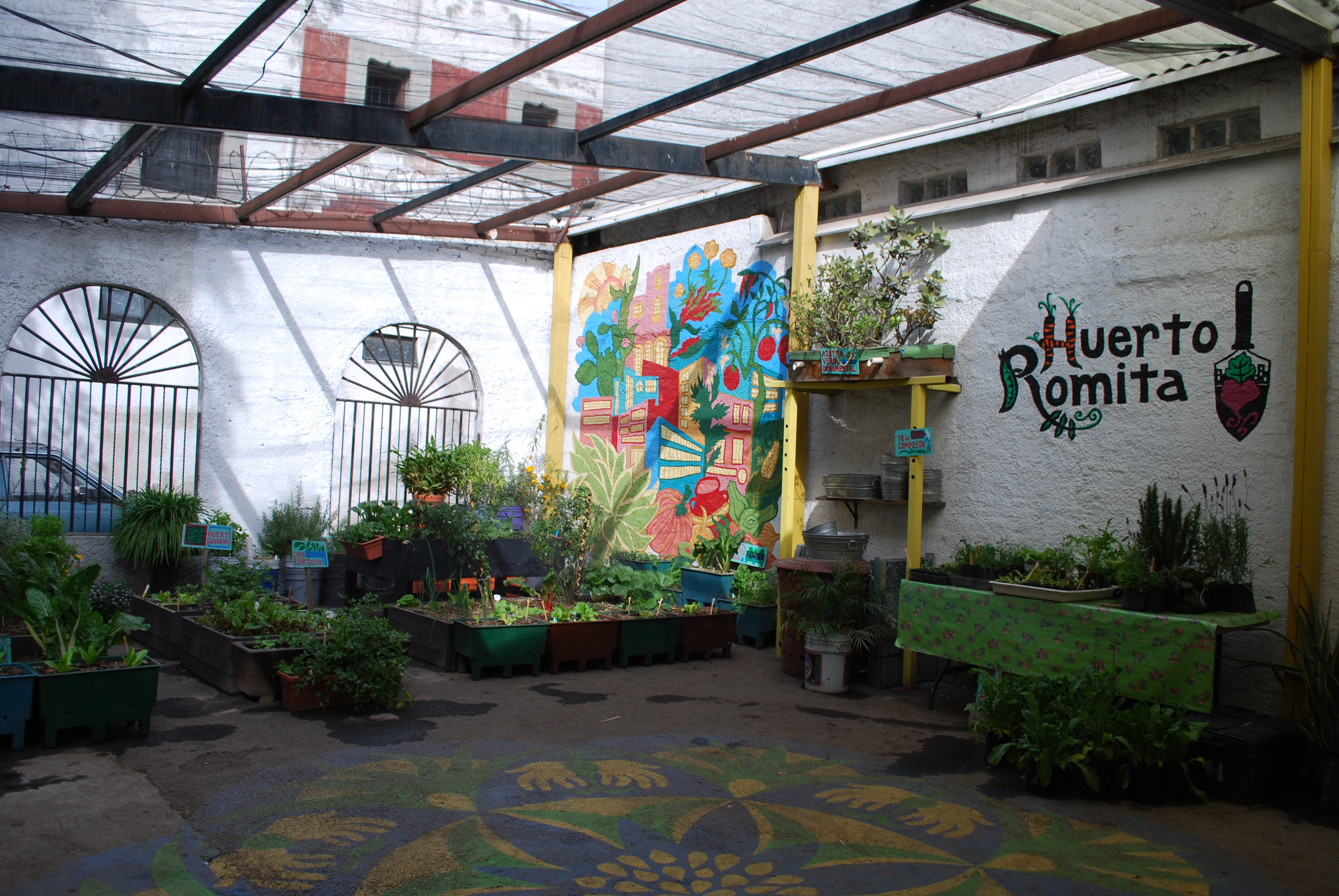
Inside Huerto Romita

La Romita is defined as the area bordered by Puebla, Durango and Morelia streets along with Avenida Cuauhtémoc. Because it developed differently from the rest of Colonia Roma, it consists of narrow streets which make it still relatively difficult to access.

The neighborhood's borders are defined by Puebla, Durango, Morelia streets along with Avenida Cuauhtémoc. Today it is centered on a square called Plaza de Romita, one block from the main thoroughfare of Avenida Cuauhtémoc, connected to that street called Calle Real de Romita. This small square is paved in stone with a fountain in the center and trees around it. Surrounding the square, there are a number of older constructions with only one floor which recalls the area's past along with an office building from the mid 20th century. However, the most important construction is the Santa María de la Natividad Aztacalco church, a small construction built in 1530. Those sentenced to hang on the trees of the village would ask for forgiveness in the church before the sentence was carried out. It served as a parish church until 1962 when it was "demoted" to a chapel. It is still the main church of the community and contains a crucifix on the main altar said to date from the 16th century, one of five sent by the king of Spain to Mexico.

One notable area off the plaza is an alleyway that extends from the plaza behind the church. This was formerly abandoned but today the walls that enclose it are used by local artists to paint over, making it filled with eclectic images. Another notable area is the Huerto La Romita, a small area dedicated to urban agriculture. The area's resident grow organic fruits and vegetables and offer classes in urban organic agriculture.
