= Bernardo Rodríguez =

Cuban baseball player (born 1904

- Pitcher
- Born: 1904; Havana, Cuba
- Died: Unknown
- Batted: Unknown Threw: Unknown

Negro league baseball debut
- 1927, for the Cuban Stars (East)

Last appearance
- 1927, for the Cuban Stars (East)

Eastern Colored League statistics
- Win–loss record: 1–1
- Earned run average: 6.29
- Strikeouts: 3

Teams
- Cuban Stars (East) (1927)
Medals
Men's baseball
Representing Cuba
Central American and Caribbean Games
Gold medal – first place	1926 Mexico City	Team

Bernardo Rodríguez was a Cuban professional baseball pitcher in the Negro leagues in 1927.

A native of Havana, Cuba, Rodríguez played for the Cuban Stars (East) in 1927. In four recorded appearances on the mound (three of which he started), he posted a 1–1 win–loss record with an earned run average (ERA) of 6.29 and a 3:9 strikeout-to-walk ratio over 24 1/3 innings.
