= Mercado Medellín =

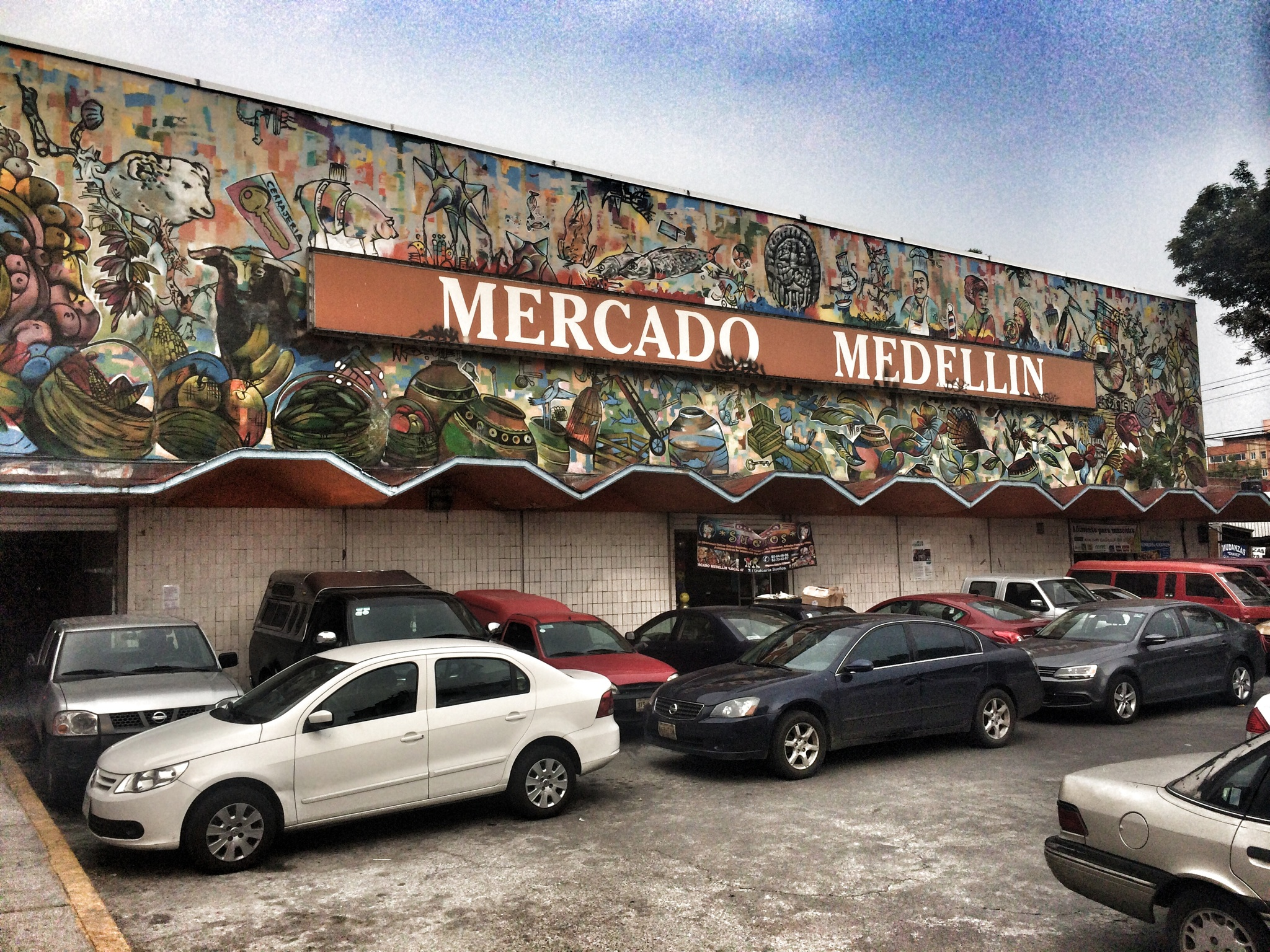
- Location in Mexico City

General information
- Coordinates: 19.410349°N 99.163432°W

The Mercado de Medellín ("Medellín market"), also Mercado Medellín and officially Mercado Melchor Ocampo is a public market located on Medellín street in Colonia Roma Sur neighborhood of Mexico City. It is known as the market in the city where one can find produce and goods from other countries in Latin America such as Colombia and Cuba, whose flags hang from many stalls, as well as from Yucatán in Mexico. It has been nicknamed "La Pequeña Habana" (Little Havana), and there are over 500 stalls in total.
