= Yehuda Halevi Synagogue =

Synagogue in Tlaxcala, Mexico

- Spanish: Sinagoga Rabí Yehuda Halevi

Religion
- Affiliation: Judaism
- Rite: Nusach Sefard
- Year consecrated: 1942

Location
- Location: Calle Monterrey 359, Colonia Roma, Mexico D.F.
- Country: Mexico
- Location in Mexico City
- Coordinates: 19°24′17″N 99°9′40″W

Architecture
- Architect: Francisco Cánovas
- Established: 1924 (as a congregation)
- Completed: 1942

The Yehuda HaLevi Synagogue (Spanish: Sinagoga Rabí Yehuda Halevi) is a Jewish congregation and synagogue, located in the Colonia Roma neighborhood of Mexico City, in Mexico. Built between 1941 and 1942, the synagogue was named after Yehudah Halevi, Jewish philosopher, physician and poet from medieval Spain.

== History ==
In 1924, the Sephardic Jewish community of Mexico City unified as an organization called «La Fraternidad» (The Brotherhood). The Sepharadim did not have a synagogue of their own, having to use other synagogues and Jewish community buildings. However, they still ran into space issues. The organization used a Protestant Church for a while before deciding in the 1940s to have their own building. In 1941, the organization bought a plot of land on Calle Monterrey, where the congregation remains to this day.

The design of the building was chosen in a contest. The winning submission was by engineer Francisco Cánovas and was inspired by the Sephardic synagogue in Vidin, Bulgaria. Construction finished in 1942 and the synagogue was consecrated in honor of Yehuda Halevi at the suggestion of La Fraternidad member Victor Babani.

== See also ==
- History of the Jews in Mexico
- List of synagogues in Mexico
