= Universidad de la Comunicación =

Mexican university

Coordinates: 19.4159°N 99.1598°W

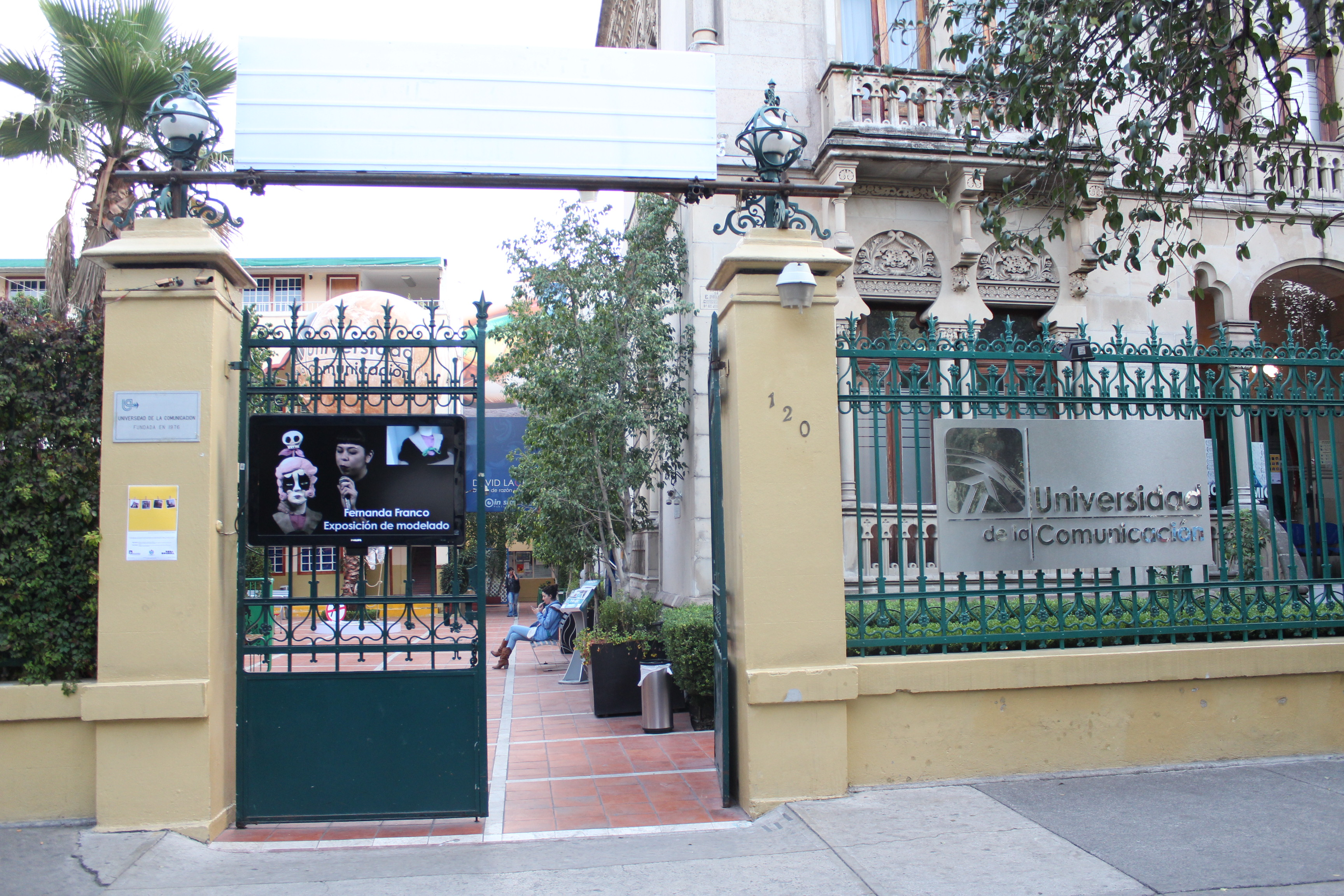
- Motto: Pensamiento, Comprensión y Acción.
- Motto in English: Though, Comprehension and Action
- Established: December 13, 1976
- Rector: Dr. Salvador Corrales Ayala
- Location: Mexico City, Mexico

The Universidad de la Comunicación (University of Communication) is a private university founded on December 13, 1976, that teaches undergraduate courses related to communication and culture such as: Publicity, Communication and Management of Culture and Art, Social Communication, Visual Communication, Organizational Communication, Marketing and Film.

It has the validation of the Mexican Secretariat of Public Education and the recognition of the International Advertising Association.

== Campus ==
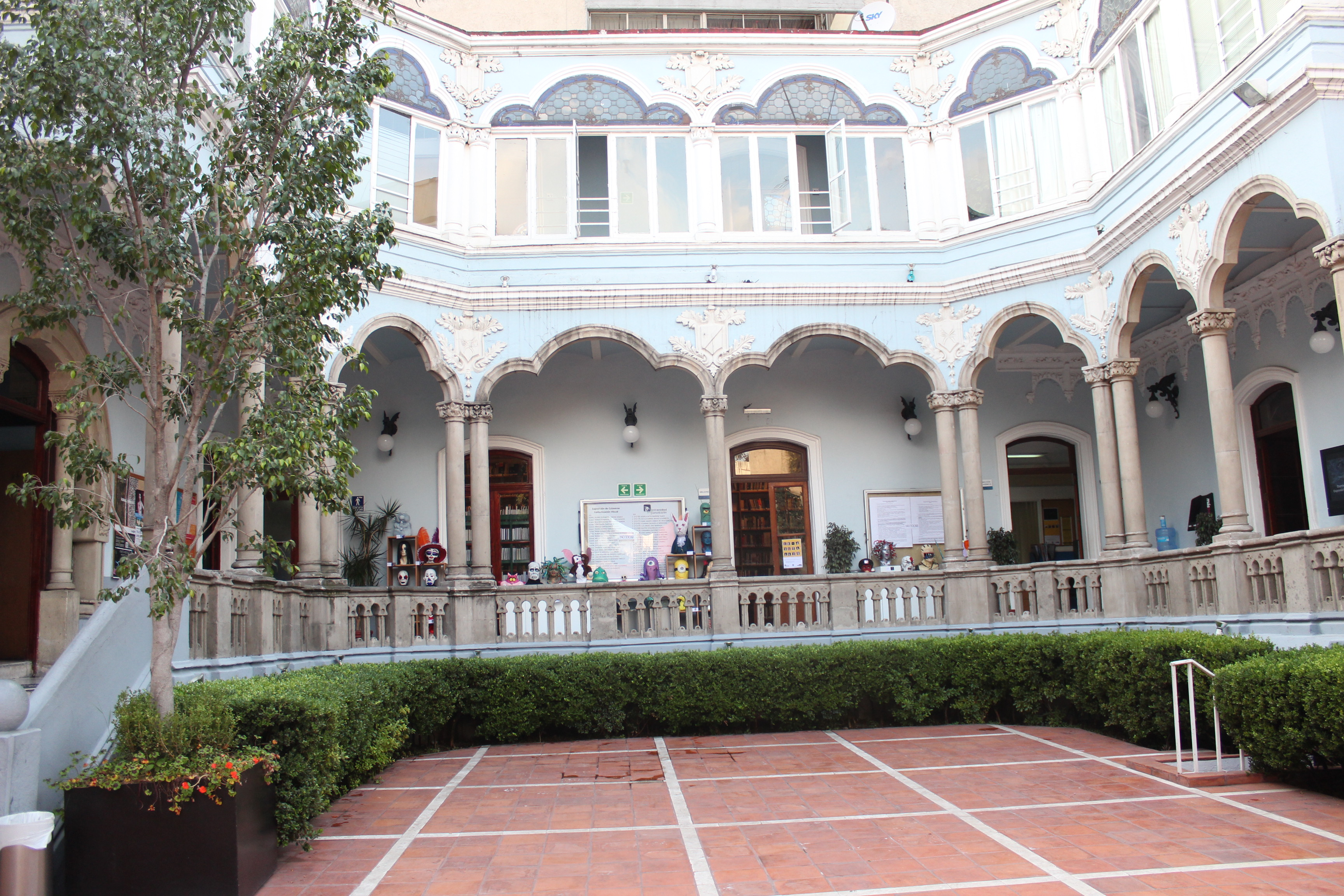
Interior of the campus

The university is located at Zacatecas street #120 in a building that dates from the 1920s designed by architect E. Prunes, who took inspiration from the Palace of Azahara, with Islamic characteristics that can be seen on windows and balconies and “starting with the reliefs on the columns and its ends”. Its architecture is also considered eclectic, since it includes styles such as art nouveau and from the renaissance.

== History ==
As a start the building was habitational, being a grand manor located on the then new Colonia Roma, but then its use became educational as it has held several institutions like the Hebrew College Mount Sinai, the Mexican Liceum and the College Walden Dos.
