= Plaza Río de Janeiro =

Park in Mexico City, Mexico

Coordinates: 19°25′16″N 99°09′38″W

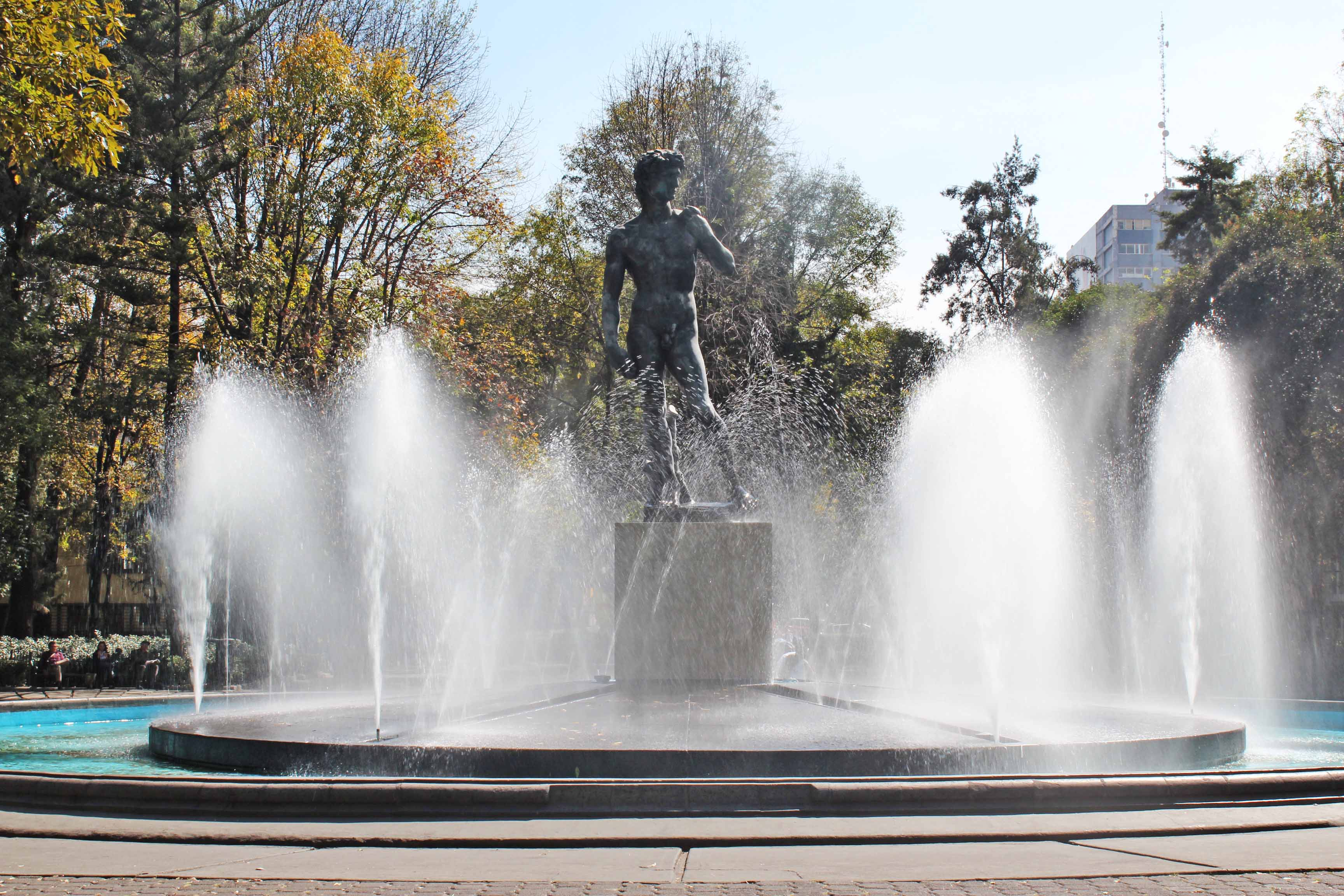
The replica of Michelangelo’s David in Plaza Río de Janeiro

Plaza Río de Janeiro (originally Plaza Roma) is a public park in Roma, Mexico City. It is east of Fuente de Cibeles and north of Plaza Luis Cabrera. The central feature of Plaza Río de Janeiro is a fountain with a replica of Michelangelo’s David.

This plaza is surrounded by old mansions and modern residential buildings.

The first name of the square was Parque Roma; later it was changed to Parque Orizaba, due to the North-South street that intersects the park. In 1922 it was renamed Plaza Río de Janeiro at the initiative of José Vasconcelos, then Secretary of Public Education, possibly because Mexico was invited to attend the celebration of the centenary of Brazil's independence that year.

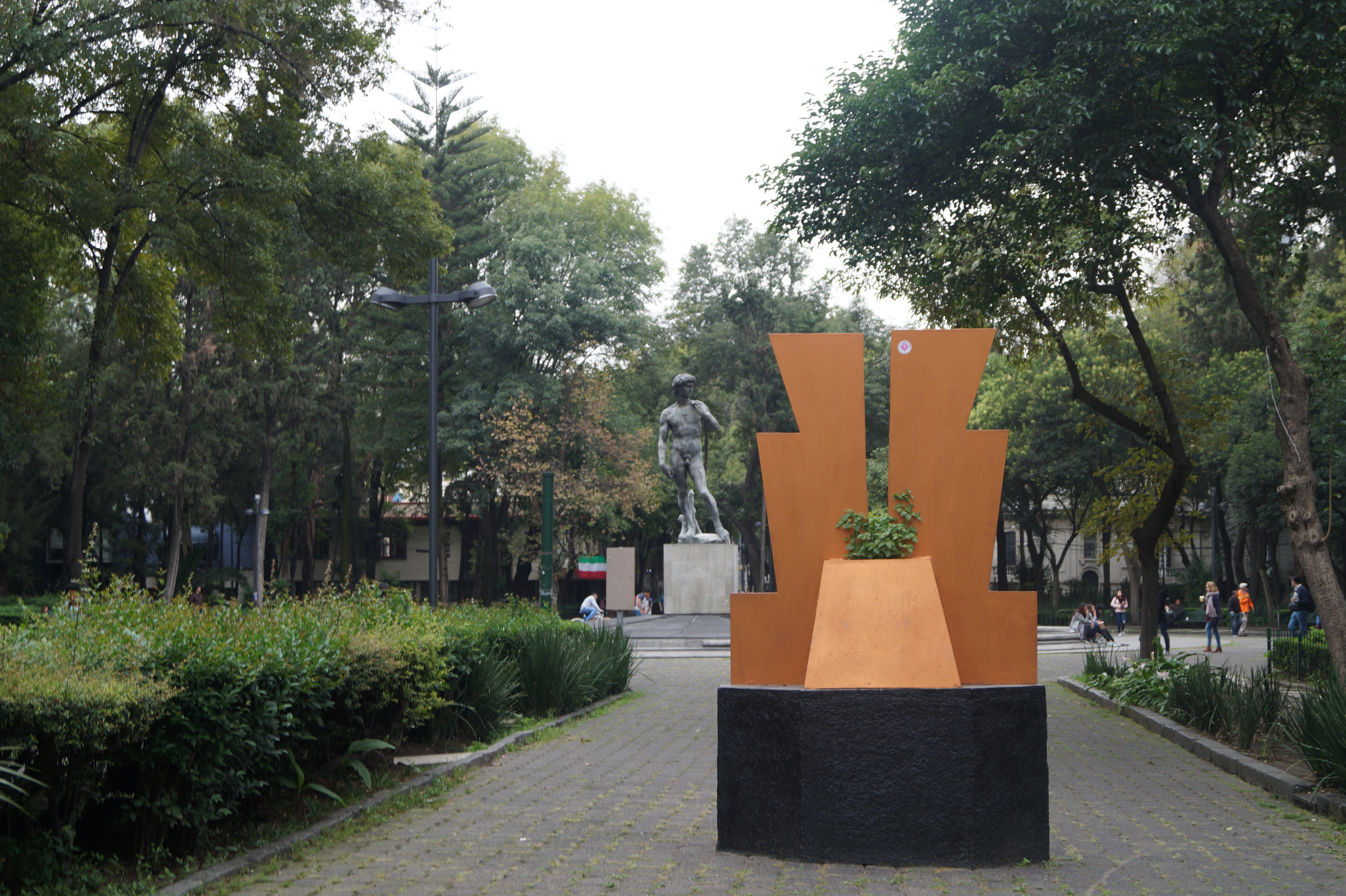
Plaza Río de Janeiro with its David replica statue
