= Roberto Márquez (painter) =

Roberto Marquez (born 1959) is a painter originally from Mexico. He was born in Mexico City and spent his later childhood in Guadalajara, where he graduated from Instituto Tecnológico y de Estudios Superiores de Occidente. He later moved to Arizona, and then to New York. His paintings incorporate dreamlike images from literature, Mexican history, and himself. His work is known for its "literary allusions and visual metaphors" and for its frequent references to music.

Marquez's art has been collected and exhibited in numerous shows in galleries and museums, including the Tucson Museum of Art, Museo de Arte Contemporáneo de Monterrey, Hirshhorn Museum, and Mexican Cultural Institute of Washington. His work is the subject of a 2002 book by Edward Lucie-Smith.
