= Plaza Luis Cabrera =

Public park in Mexico City

Coordinates: 19°24′59″N 99°09′34″W

- City square
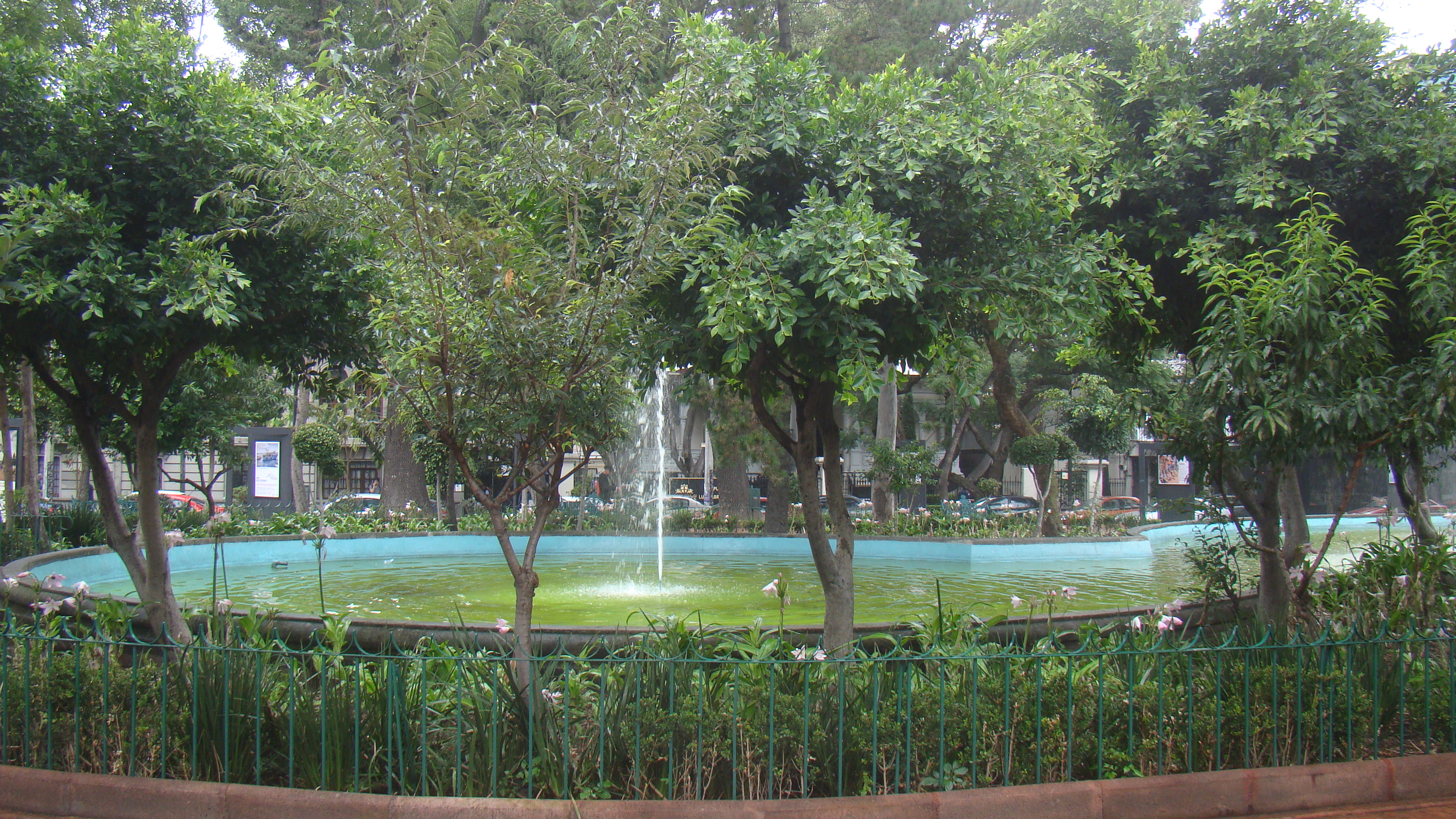
- The park in 2016
- Features: Green space, fountain
- Opened: c. 1900
- Area: 1.4 acres (0.57 ha)
- Dedicated to: Luis Cabrera Lobato
- Location: Colonia Roma, Mexico City
- Interactive map of Plaza Luis Cabrera

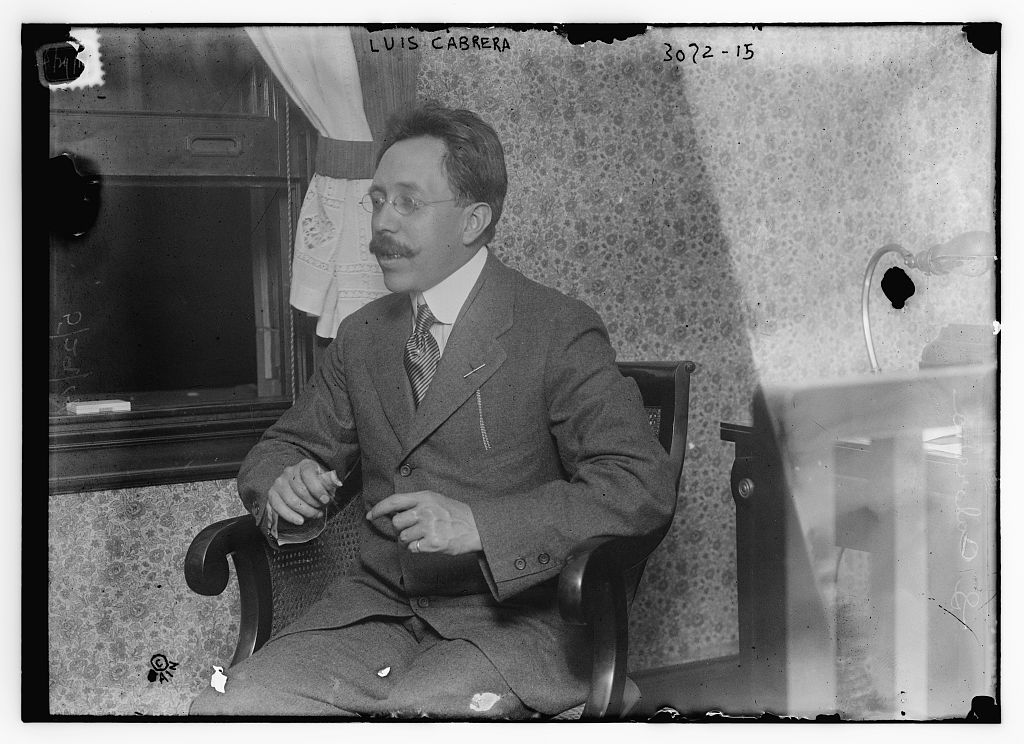
Luis Cabrera Lobato is honored as the namesake of the park

Plaza Luis Cabrera is a public space in Colonia Roma, Mexico City. It is a cafe-ringed plaza with trees and a fountain which memorializes Luis Cabrera Lobato.

Plaza Luis Cabrera is located on Orizaba Street at Zacatecas Street. To its north is Plaza Río de Janeiro.

In the 1950s the plaza was frequented by some American Beat Generation writers such as Jack Kerouac, William Burroughs, Allen Ginsberg and others. It hosted anti-Trump No Kings protests in 2025.

== Gallery ==
The plaza from Orizaba Street, 2025

Path to the fountain

The central fountain

Lilies beside the fountain

Elephant-shaped benches

Wrought-iron bench

Open-air photography exhibition

Dedication plaque

Building facing the plaza

Universidad de Londres, Campus Luis Cabrera, at no. 9
