= Instituto Nacional del Derecho de Autor =

The Instituto Nacional del Derecho de Autor is Mexico's Copyright office. It works at a federal level.
