= Estadio Nacional (Mexico) =

Multi-use stadium in Mexico City, Mexico

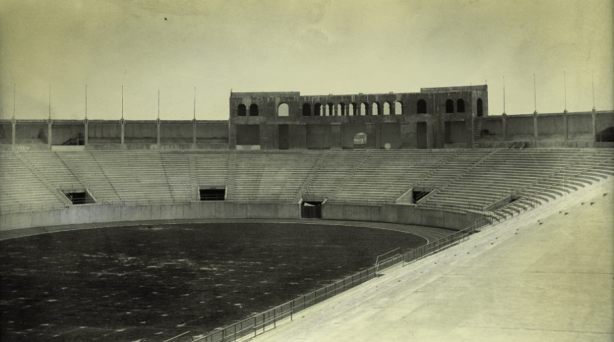
- Interactive map of Estadio Nacional
- Location: Colonia Roma, Mexico City, Mexico
- Coordinates: 19.409436°N 99.155994°W
- Capacity: 30,000

Construction
- Groundbreaking: 1923
- Opened: 1924
- Closed: 1949
- Demolished: 1949
- Architect: José Villagrán García

Tenant
- 1926 Central American and Caribbean Games

Estadio Nacional was a multi-use stadium in the Colonia Roma neighborhood in central Mexico City, Mexico. The stadium hosted the first edition of the Central American and Caribbean Games in 1926 and it was mostly used for football, American football and athletics.

== History ==
The Estadio Nacional, designed by architect was José Villagrán García, broke ground in 1923 and was inaugurated on 5 May 1924 by president Álvaro Obregón. It was the largest stadium in Mexico City and it was used for football, American football and athletics. The stadium was closed and demolished in 1949 during the government of Miguel Alemán Valdés.

It was replaced by the Estadio Olímpico Universitario in the Ciudad Universitaria, in the south of the city, in 1949, and the site was used for multifamily housing which was demolished after damage from the 1985 Mexico City earthquake. Today the site is a park, the Jardín Ramón López Velarde. Initially, the capacity of the stadium was 60,000 spectators, that was later reduced to 30,000 seats.
