= Gabriela López Cruz =

Mexican restaurateur

- Occupation: Restaurateur
- Spouse: Eduardo "Lalo" García

Gabriela López Cruz is a Mexican restaurateur. Together with her husband, the chef Lalo García, she co-founded the restaurant Máximo Bistrot in Colonia Roma, Mexico City, in 2011. She is the CEO of Grupo Maximus, their restaurant group.

== Career ==
López studied restaurant management and began her career at the Four Seasons hotel. She then worked for the chef Enrique Olvera, and at Pujol she met García, who was a cook there. The two opened Olvera's restaurant at the Habita MTY hotel in Monterrey. She left her job at the Brick Hotel in Colonia Roma and spent a year with García in Yelapa, Jalisco, running the restaurant of a beach hotel.

In 2011 the couple opened Máximo Bistrot on the corner of Tonalá and Zacatecas streets in Colonia Roma. García ran the kitchen and she handled everything else; at first she also managed the dining room. In 2014 they opened Lalo!, serving breakfast and lunch, and in late 2015 Havre 77, a French restaurant in Colonia Juárez. Máximo later moved to Avenida Álvaro Obregón and in 2025 was awarded a Michelin star.

=== Grupo Maximus ===
López is the CEO of the group, which she runs together with García. López and García's own restaurants are Máximo, Lalo!, Havre 77 and Panadería Gala; the others belong to partner chefs, such as Lucho Martínez and Fernanda Torres (Em, Martínez, Ultramarinos Demar, Café Tormenta). In August 2024 the group had 15 restaurants in the city.
