= Casa del Poeta López Velarde =

Casa del Poeta Ramón López Velarde
- Museo Casa del Poeta Ramón López Velarde
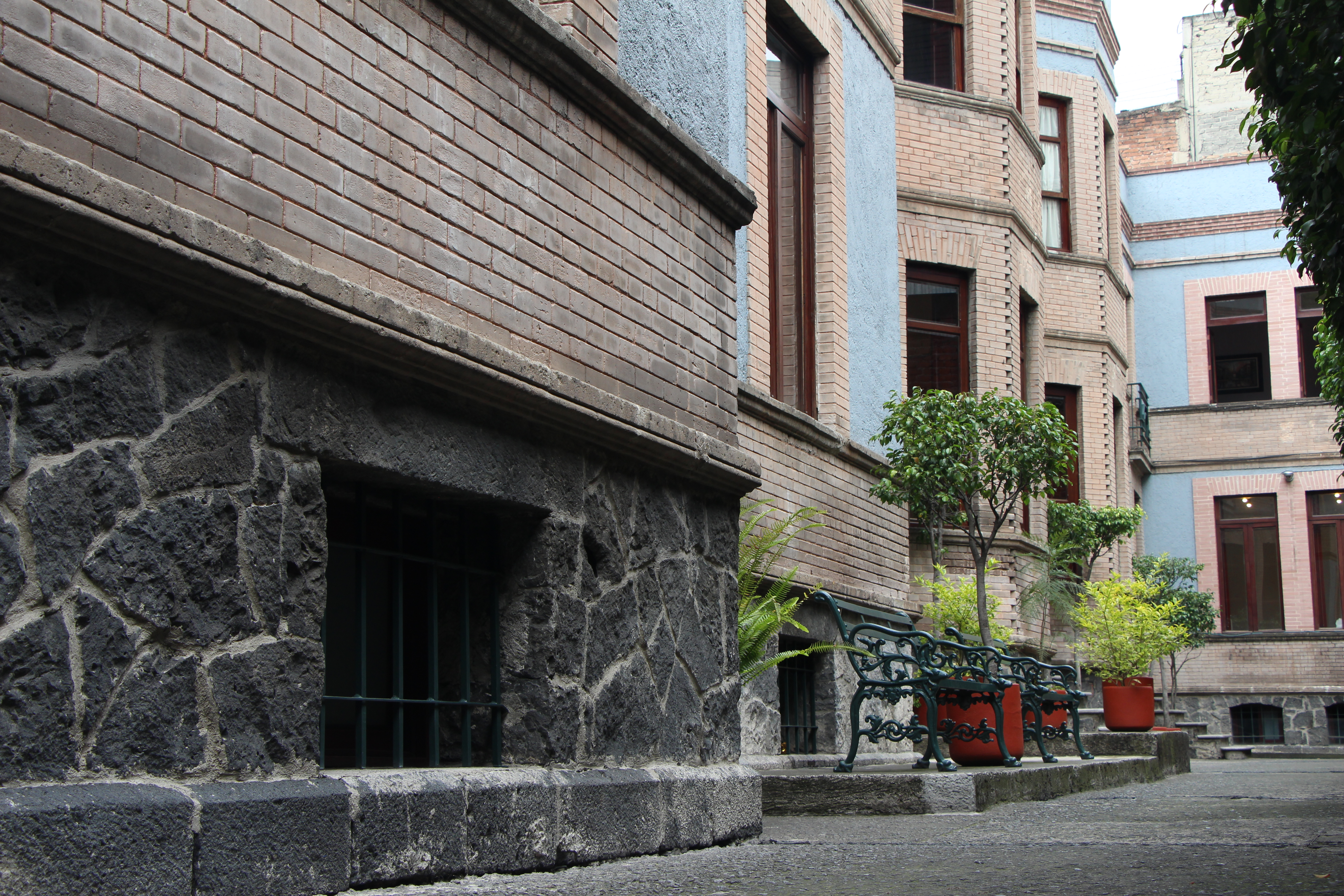
- Main entrance at Avenida Álvaro Obregón 73, Colonia Roma
- Established: 28 November 1991
- Location: Avenida Álvaro Obregón 73, Roma Norte, Cuauhtémoc, Mexico City, 06700
- Coordinates: 19.4188°N 99.1582°W
- Type: Historic house museum, literary research center
- Public transit access: Add→{{rail-interchange}} Insurgentes, Niños Héroes; Add→{{rail-interchange}} Álvaro Obregón
- Website: casadelpoeta.iap.org.mx (archived)

The Casa del Poeta Ramón López Velarde (lit. 'Ramón López Velarde House of the Poet') is a historic house museum, library, and cultural venue in Roma Norte, Mexico City. The institution occupies an early-20th-century residential townhouse where Zacatecan poet Ramón López Velarde lived with his family prior to his death in 1921.

The property operates as a private assistance foundation (Institución de Asistencia Privada), established to preserve the author's physical living quarters and promote Mexican poetry. It houses the personal collections of poets Salvador Novo and Efraín Huerta across two specialized research libraries, and serves as an active literary salon hosting seminars, readings in Spanish and indigenous languages, and creative writing workshops.

== History ==
=== Building and López Velarde's residency ===
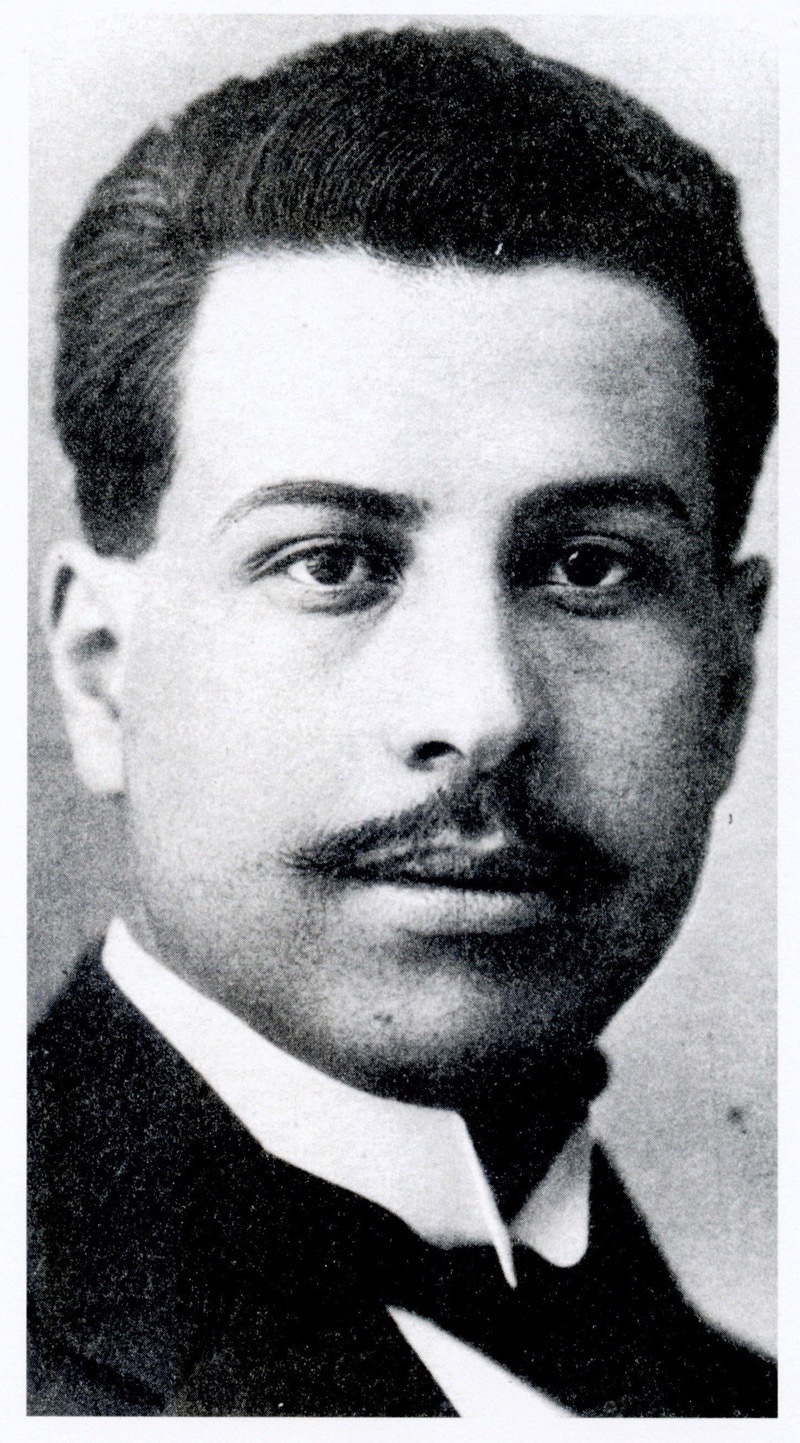
Ramón López Velarde, who lived and died in the building

The two-story residence was constructed during the final years of the Porfiriato as an eclectic-style tenement house (vecindad) consisting of small rental apartments, reflecting the early development of Avenida Jalisco (later renamed Avenida Álvaro Obregón) during the initial urban expansion of Colonia Roma.

Following his departure from San Luis Potosí, López Velarde reunited with his mother and brothers at this address on 10 January 1914. While municipal tourism registries often place his occupancy exclusively from 1918 to 1921 in apartment 3, archival sources note that the building remained divided into rented sections, and historical records do not definitively establish which quarters his family occupied throughout the entire decade. During his years at this address, López Velarde composed central works of his literary corpus, including the poetry collection Zozobra (1919) and his national civic allegory "La Suave Patria" (1921). On 19 June 1921, he died in his bedroom of acute bronchopneumonia complicated by pleurisy at the age of 33.

=== Decline and heritage protection ===
After the poet's family vacated the property, the structure was occupied by private tenants and suffered substantial structural damage. Several spaces were converted into mechanical repair and trade workshops, which knocked down interior load-bearing partitions, damaged the Porfirian ironwork, and degraded the building's central courtyards.

In 1971, marking the 50th anniversary of López Velarde's death, the state government of Zacatecas mounted a commemorative bronze plaque on the building's facade. The National Institute of Anthropology and History (INAH) subsequently cataloged the property as a protected historic monument (Catalog ID 05385). In 1989, the Departamento del Distrito Federal (DDF), the Mexico City government, acquired the building for public cultural benefit. An architectural restoration took place between 1989 and 1991, structurally reinforcing the facade, clearing the courtyard spaces, and adapting the building's 763.8 square metres (8,221 sq ft) footprint for cultural administration. The museum was officially inaugurated on 28 November 1991 under a trust headed by literary scholar Guillermo Sheridan.

== Museum layout and facilities ==
=== Memorial rooms and metaphorical installation ===
The upper floor of the complex houses the author's memorial quarters. Sheridan curated the historical reconstruction of López Velarde's study and bedroom, using archival inventories and period furnishings to recreate an austere domestic environment of the early 1920s. Displayed artifacts include an antique washstand (aguamanil), a brass bed with embroidered linens, his writing desk, original correspondence, family photographs, and a worn leather travel trunk symbolizing the author's unfulfilled dream of journeying to Europe.

Adjacent to the historical quarters is an experiential exhibition designed by writer and dramatist Hugo Hiriart. Visitors access the installation by walking through the double doors of an antique wardrobe located inside the bedroom, which opens into a narrow, mirror-lined passageway. The corridor features peepshow dioramas, kinetic boxes, sound recordings, and allegorical sculptures depicting motifs from López Velarde's poetry, centered around a symbolic recreation of his mourning poem "El sueño de los guantes negros" (The Dream of the Black Gloves).

=== Libraries and cultural center ===
The institution houses two non-circulating specialized poetry libraries containing over 11,000 cataloged volumes:

- Efraín Huerta Library: Features Huerta's personal working collection of 5,154 volumes, specializing in mid-20th-century Mexican literature, social verse, and cultural periodicals.
- Salvador Novo Library: Contains Novo's personal collection of 6,200 volumes, emphasizing universal poetry, theater, and modern Latin American literature.

The ground floor contains an 80-seat multipurpose auditorium, a 40-capacity workshop room, an art gallery, and the literary café-bar "Las Hormigas" (The Ants), named after one of López Velarde's poems. For decades, under the institutional direction of poet Eduardo Hurtado, the house served as a regular venue for creative writing seminars led by figures including Antonio Deltoro, alongside book presentations, academic conferences, and literary salons.

== Gallery ==
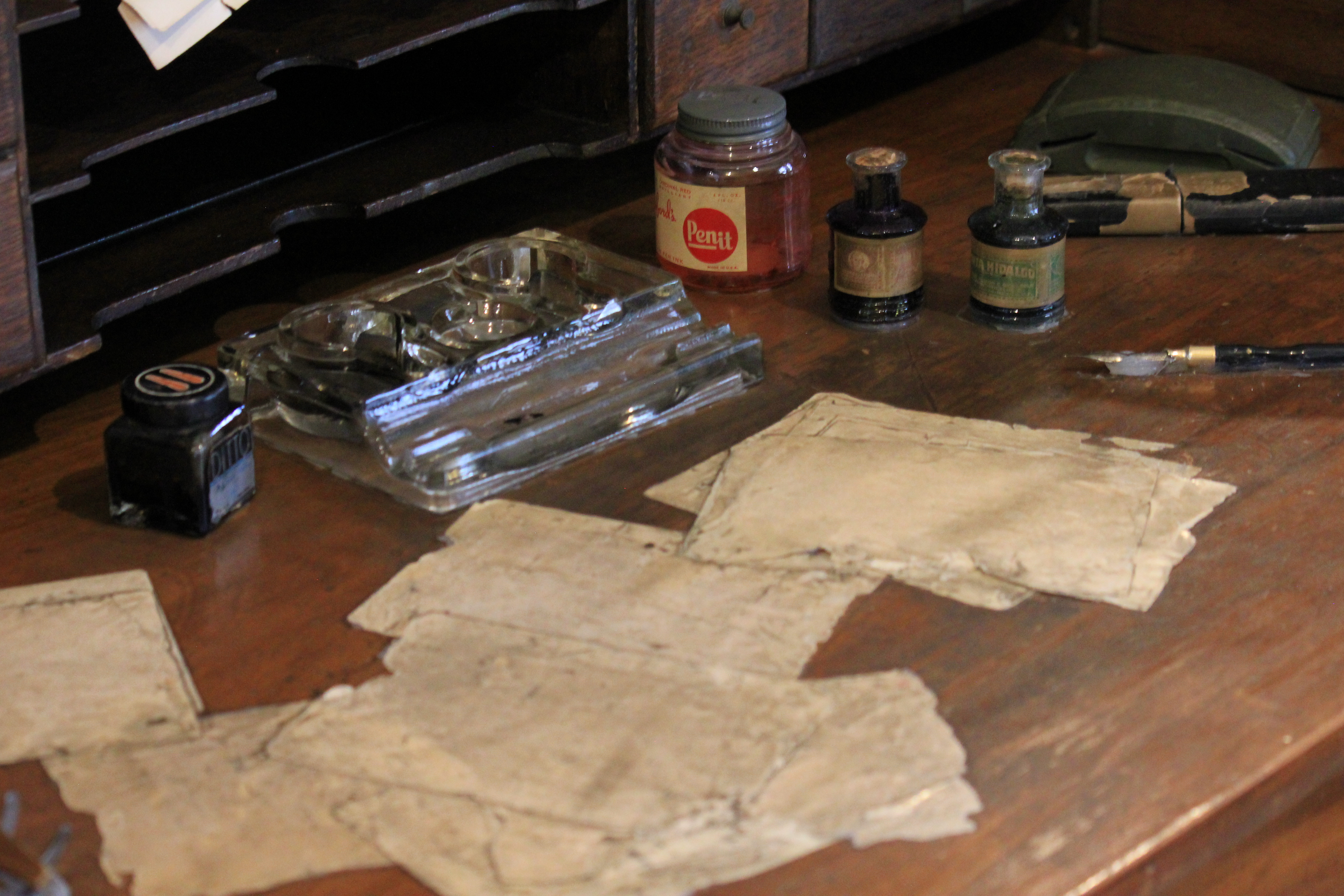
Reconstruction of the poet's writing desk

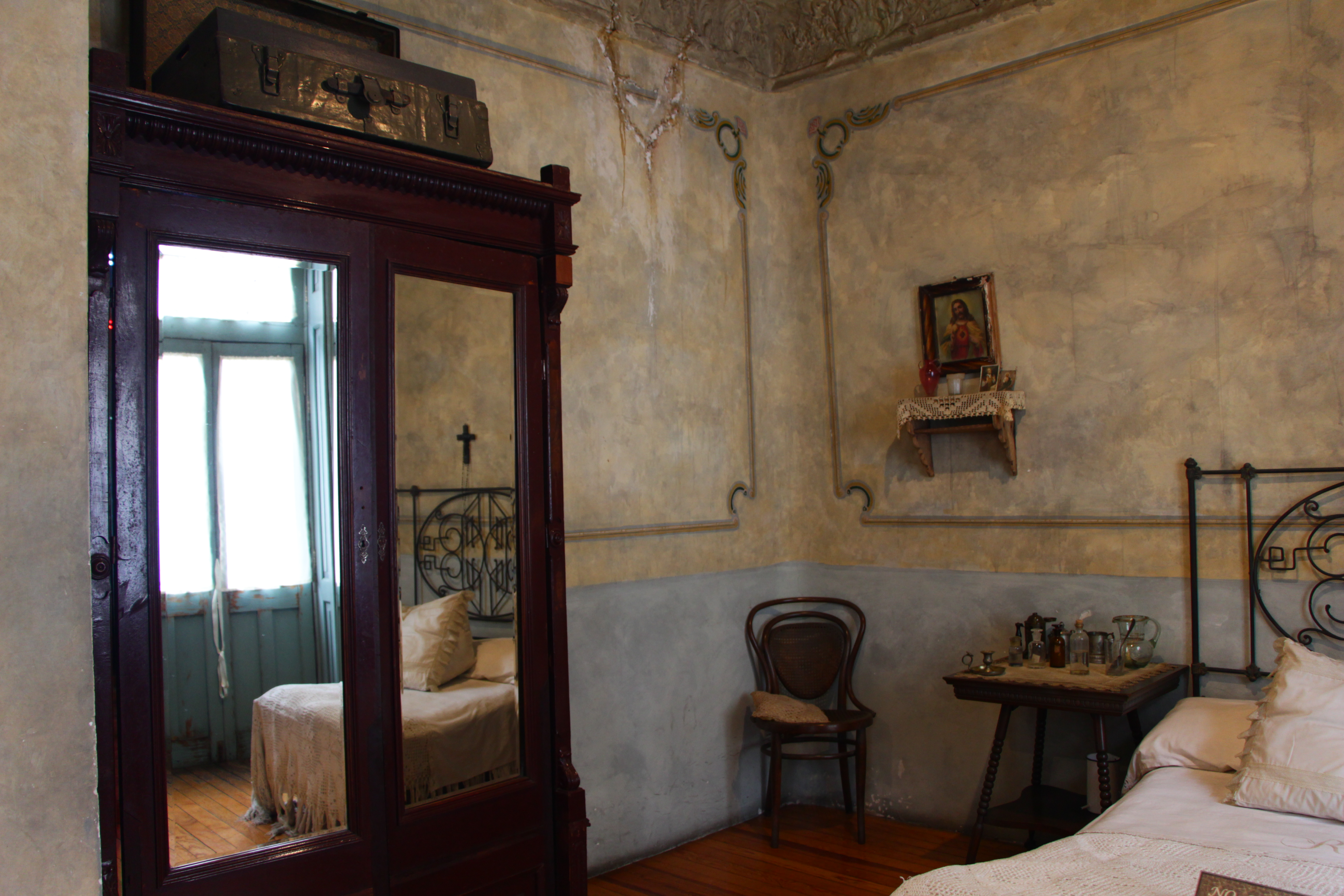
Reconstructed bedroom in apartment 3

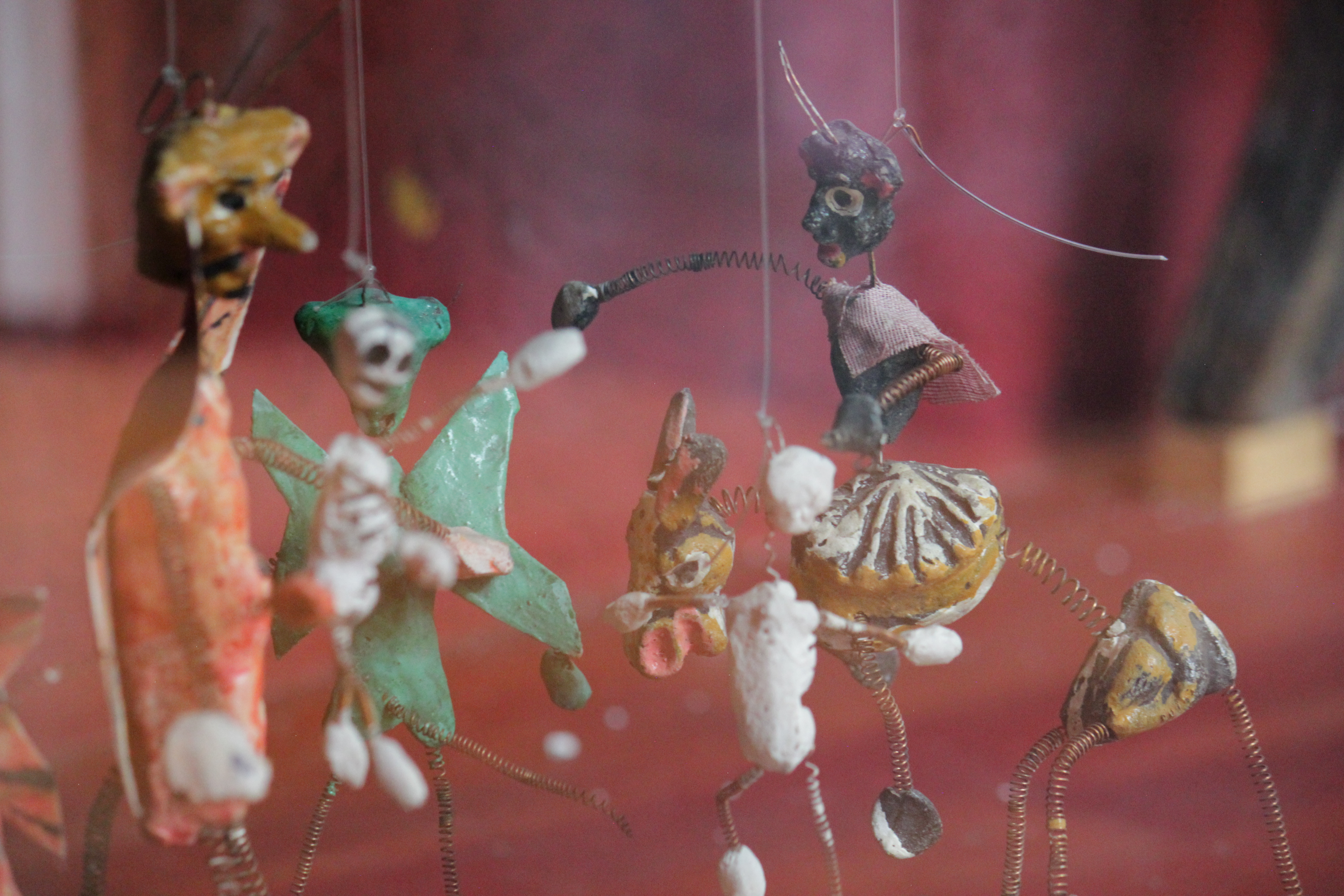
Puppet installation from Hugo Hiriart's interactive exhibit

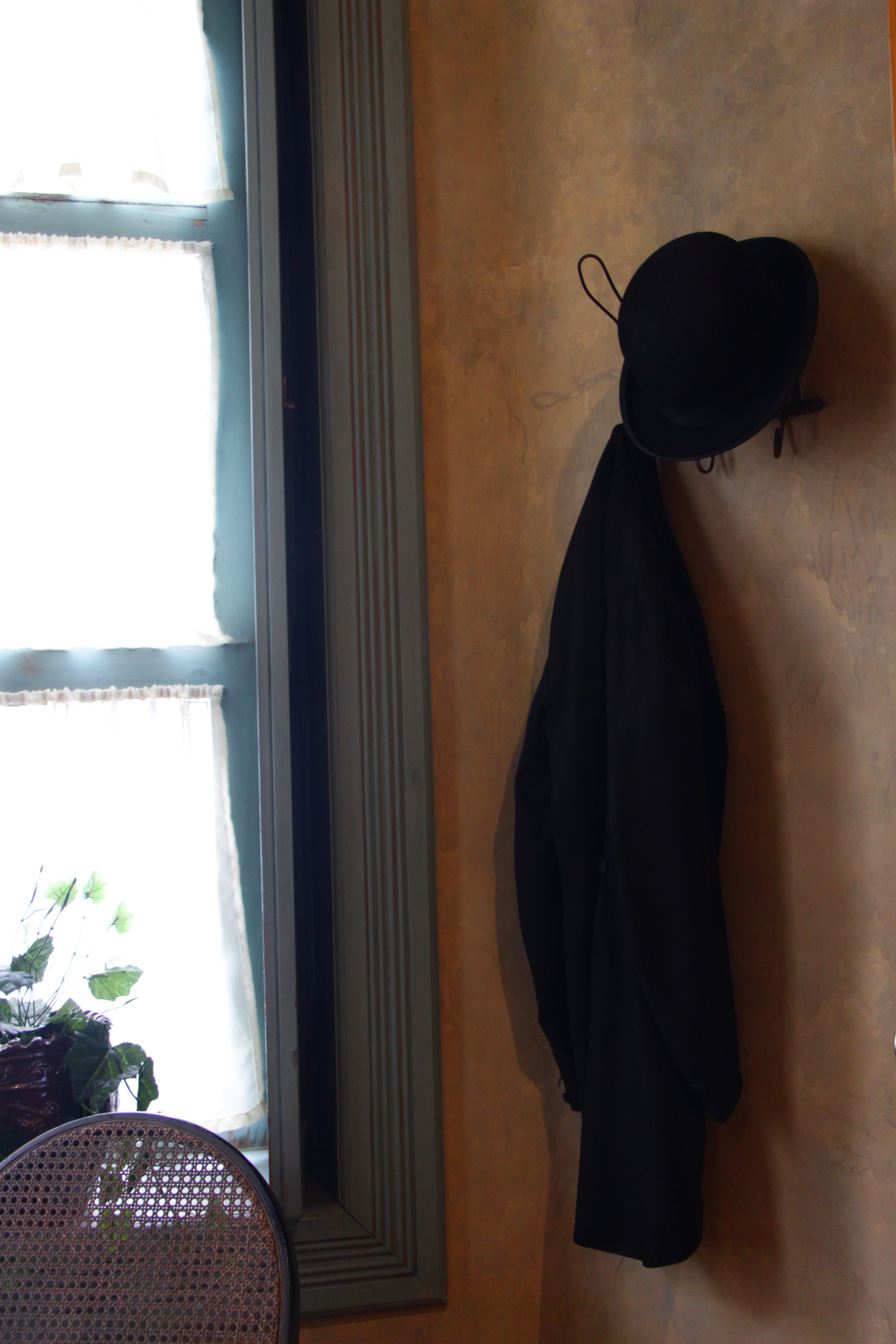
Exhibition display evoking early-1920s attire

== See also ==
- Capilla Alfonsina – House museum and research library of Mexican writer Alfonso Reyes
- Casa Lamm – Cultural center and arts institute on Avenida Álvaro Obregón
- Museo del Objeto del Objeto – Cultural museum housed in a preserved 1906 Art Nouveau building in Roma Norte
