= Asmara Gay =

Mexican writer and translator (born 1975)

Asmara Gay (born 1975) is a Mexican writer and translator. She is the editor of the magazine El Comité 1973 and member of the literary group "El Comité". In 2018 she was appointed Ambassador of the Spanish Language by the César Egido Serrano Foundation and the Museum of the Word.

== Biography ==
Gay has a Master's degree in literary creation by the Centro de Cultura Casa Lamm. Nowadays she teaches literature in Casa Lamm. Gay studied her bachelor in the UNAM.

For more than two decades Gay has published several articles, essays and poems in different magazines from Mexico and Spain. In 2014, Gay published the study "Las teorías del cuento y sus contradicciones".

== El Comité ==
In the year 2014, Gay was invited by Meneses Monroy to join to the literary group El Comité. First as a collaborator of the magazine El Comité 1973 and then as the editor of the magazine. In 2017 the group celebrated its fifth anniversary and Asmara Gay was part of the celebration that took place in the Centro Cultural del México Contemporáneo.

== Works ==
- Elena se mira en el espejo, 2011, Gay, Asmara. México, D. F.: Editorial Grupo Destiempos.
- Homenaje a Juan García Ponce : Imagen primera y La noche : cincuenta años después, 2015, Vv aa. Coordinación y presentación de Magda Díaz y Morales. México, D. F.: Instituto Veracruzano de la Cultura (Voladores).
- El ensayo: fundamentos y ejercicios, 2018, Gay, Asmara. Ciudad de México: Fundación Universitaria de Derecho y Administración Política.
- Asmara Gay is also the Director of the recognized Revista Hispanoamericana de Literatura (Hispanoamerican Literature Review), edited by IJ Editores.
