= Toño Cedeño =

Mexican academic

- Born: May 20, 1970; Mexico City
- Occupations: oculist; visual artist; collector
- Movement: collage

Toño Cedeño (born May 20, 1970) is an art historian, theologian, optometrist, visual artist and founder of the Oqli Collection.

== Studies ==
Cedeño studied optometry at the Superior School of Medicine Instituto Politécnico Nacional, IPN. He later studied for a master's degree in Theology at the Universidad Iberoamericana. In 2005 he obtained a Doctorate in Art History from Casa Lamm, with the thesis 'The female image on Mexican banknotes'.

Among his teachers are Dr. Margarita Martínez Lámbarry, Dr. Teresa del Conde, Master Jorge Alberto Manrique Castañeda, Dr. Claudia Gómez Haro, and Dr. Tomas Pérez Vejo.

== Creative career ==
In his youth he made trips to the city of Oaxaca, and the artisan and visual arts culture of that state influenced his closeness to the world of art. In his work of collage and painting, he approaches pop art, and naif art. He has also worked as curator in events such as the exhibition dedicated to Pedro Infante in 2017, at the Centro de Arte Bicentenario Poeta Hugo Gutiérrez Vega.

== Art exhibitions ==
SOLO SHOWS

- Flores de Ingenua ingenuidad. Casa de la Cultura de Tlalpan. Mexico City. 2019
- San Antoñito. Escuela de Bellas Artes de Toluca. 2012
- Toño Cedeño Collages. Instituto Iconos. Mexico City. 2011

GROUP SHOWS

- “IN CVT WE TRVST”, Museo del Juguete Antiguo México, México (MUJAM), México, 2018.
- Mujeres de Hoy. Casa de Cultura STUNAM. / Suburbano. 2014.
- Trazo presente, Gal. Ligia Fenollosa. 2013.

PERFORMANCE

- Participation in the performance tribute to Frida Kahlo, by Iris México, in front of the Palacio de Bellas Artes, in 2007.

== Oqli Collection ==
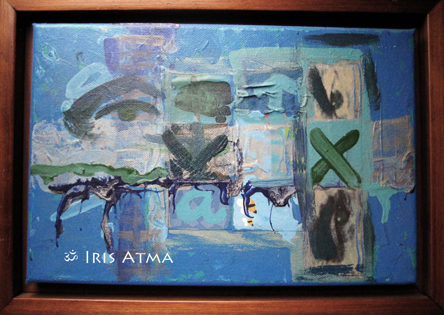
Atma Iris - Omnia Mare - Coleccion Oqli

Through an exchange program of glasses for works of arts and crafts, he has gathered a large collection of works for more than a decade.

Part of this collection has been promoted in collective exhibitions, the first of these in 2013, entitled Oqli Collection: Portraits, with works by Claudia Ramos, Iris Atma (Iris México), Jorge Granados, Dunkel Galicia, Carlos Bautista, América Rodríguez, J.Macdonald Henry, Hugo Navarro, Blanca Dorantes, Alejandro Pereyra, among others.

Cedeño also dedicated other events to the women artists in the collection.

Cedeño also published the book Hojas Paralelas ("Parallel Leaves") as a part of this project.
