= Lalo (restaurant) =

Restaurant in Mexico City

- Dining room with the mural by Bué the Warrior, 2015
- Interactive map of Lalo

Restaurant information
- Established: November 2014
- Owners: Lalo García and Gabriela López
- Food type: Italian with local Mexican influences
- Location: Zacatecas 173, Colonia Roma, Cuauhtémoc, Mexico City, Mexico
- Website: eat-lalo.com

Lalo (styled Lalo! at its opening) is a restaurant in Colonia Roma, Mexico City, owned by the chef Eduardo "Lalo" García and his wife, Gabriela López. It opened in November 2014 (Note: Contemporary reviews date the opening to November 2014, while the restaurant's own branding reads "desde 2013" (since 2013), and 2026 coverage of its relaunch refers to thirteen years of operation.) across the street from their restaurant Máximo as a cheaper, informal place for breakfast and lunch, and its breakfasts made it one of the best-known places to eat in the neighborhood. In 2026 it was renovated and reopened as an Italian restaurant serving lunch and dinner.

== History ==
=== Opening ===
García and López opened Máximo Bistrot on Calle Tonalá in 2011. Lalo!, the couple's second restaurant, opened in November 2014 at Zacatecas 173, between Tonalá and Monterrey streets, almost opposite Máximo. García said he wanted to recreate what Máximo had been in its early days. The couple, who had traveled to Naples to learn to make pizza, first imagined it as an Italian-inspired pizzeria, but the breakfasts quickly became its main draw.

The first Lalo! had a long communal table seating about 30 people, a neon sign and a colorful cartoon mural by the Belgian graffiti artist Bué the Warrior, and played pop music. Its interiors were designed by Charles de Lisle, who also designed Máximo and the couple's French bistro Havre 77.

=== Breakfast restaurant ===
Lalo! served breakfast in the morning and switched to a lunch menu at 1 p.m. Its best-known dishes included French toast with red berries, chilaquiles in green salsa, avocado toast, buttermilk pancakes and a croque madame; at lunch it served salads made with produce from Xochimilco, Neapolitan-style pizzas and fresh pastas. Breads, pastries, jams, sauces and charcuterie were made in house. Food & Pleasure described it in 2024 as a pioneer of breakfast in Colonia Roma and noted that cooks from other restaurants ate there on their days off; by then the kitchen was run by the chef Mariana Alfarache. AD México described it in 2026 as one of the best-loved restaurants in Colonia Roma.

=== 2026 renovation ===
In 2026 García and López closed Lalo for a complete renovation by De Lisle. López said the restaurant "had grown up", and that the change would also give cooks who had prepared the same breakfasts for years new techniques to learn. It reopened in August 2026 as an Italian-inspired restaurant serving lunch and dinner, with more than 30 dishes including fresh pastas, pizzas, antipasti and Italian desserts; García described it as inspired by Italy rather than strictly Italian, and the owners estimated that about 80 percent of its ingredients are Mexican. García said that diners had long seen it as a breakfast place and had not taken its lunch and dinner seriously. At the reopening, the owners said breakfast would return in the following months.

The new interiors, which De Lisle modeled on long-established European restaurants rather than on Italian ones in particular, have three connected dining rooms with cream walls, wooden benches, veined stone and warm lighting behind a wine-colored lacquered door. The colorful mural was painted over and the long communal table replaced with small tables. The kitchen remains open to the dining room, and a new window lets passers-by watch pasta being made.

== See also ==
- List of restaurants in Mexico
