= Bué the Warrior =

Belgian street artist

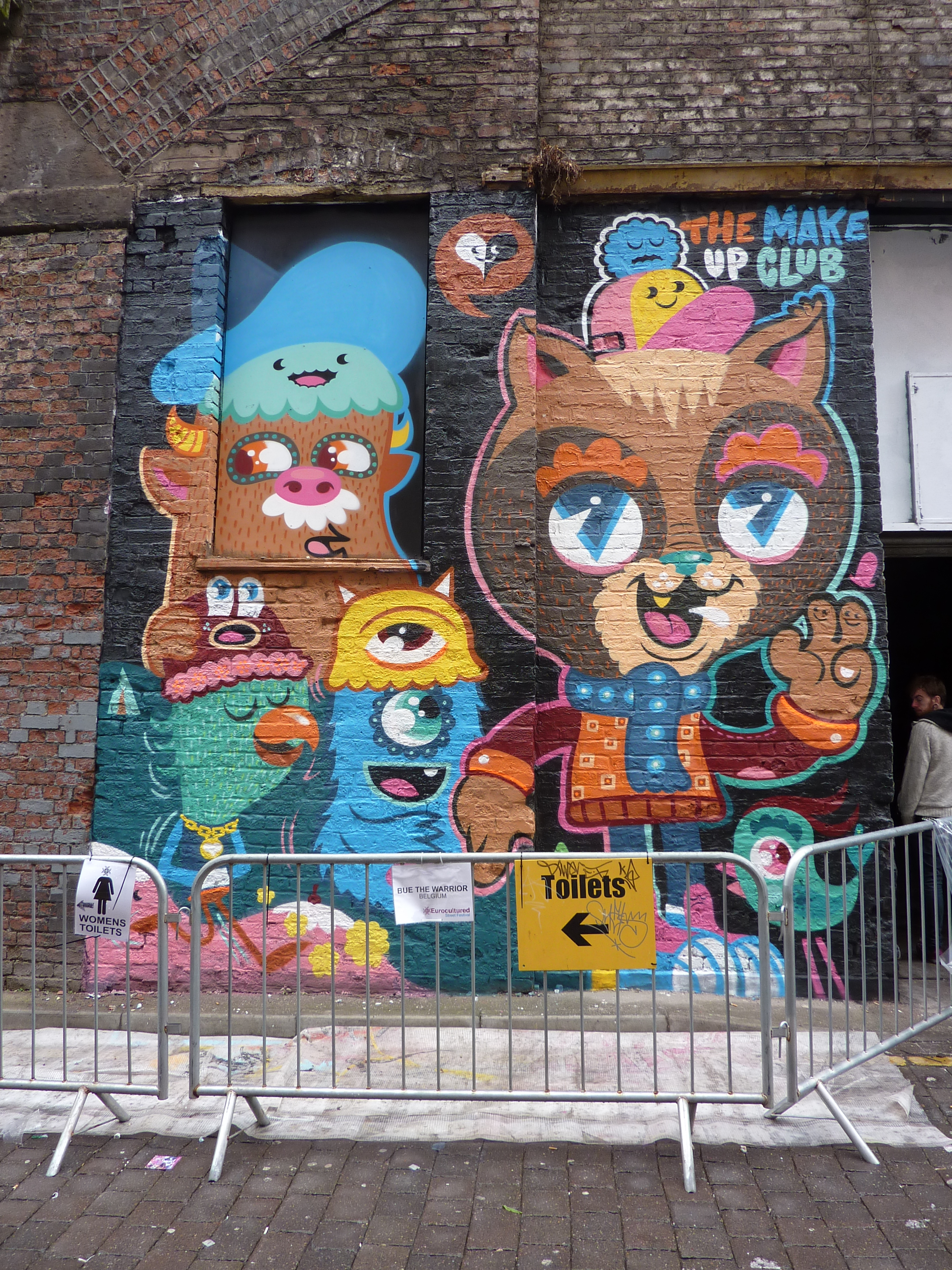
- The Make Up Club, 2011
- Born: Dave De Rop
- Known for: Street art, murals
- Website: buethewarrior.bigcartel.com

Bué the Warrior (pronounced "boo-ay"), or simply Bué, is the pseudonym of Dave De Rop, a Belgian street artist from Ghent. He is known for murals of colourful cartoon characters, often birds. He has painted in Barcelona, Berlin, New York, Bangkok and São Paulo, among other cities. In 2015 he moved to Mexico.

He is the son of the comic artist Eric De Rop and the grandson of Eduard De Rop Both worked for Willy Vandersteen's studio.

== Early life ==
De Rop grew up in a family of cartoonists. His grandfather Eduard De Rop was one of Willy Vandersteen's earliest assistants; according to Bué he drew and inked around 80 albums of Suske en Wiske and some 40 of Bessy and De Rode Ridder. His father, Eric De Rop, also worked at Studio Vandersteen. He was taught to draw at a young age. When he was 13 the family moved from Antwerp back to Ghent.

In 1991 he met two graffiti writers on a bus who were on their way to paint walls. They told him that with his drawing skills he should try spray paint, and gave him two cans; he painted his first piece that same evening. He was 17 at the time.

He first tagged as Burp, the word used in comic strips for a belch. He did not like the letters R and P and so replaced them with an E, "a nice round letter". He later found out that bue means something in several languages, e.g. "steam" or "mist" in French. He liked that. He added "the Warrior" because he does not give up easily, and will keep painting in freezing weather if a piece is not finished.

== Career ==
Bué's style borrows from comic strips and cartoons. Belgium is rainy and full of concrete, and so he puts as much colour into his walls as he can. In his own words his work is "mellow, not too conceptual, not political". His birds are a trademark. Another recurring character is HeyHey the Bear, who "lives to greet people".

He painted in Barcelona in 2007, Paris in 2009 and Mexico City in 2010; in Berlin he did walls and shutters with Billy and the Low Bros. As of 2012 he was on the road about half the year, painting at street art events, usually with local artists. He has also worked in New York, Bangkok and São Paulo, and in the favelas of Rio de Janeiro. Artists he has painted with include his fellow Ghent artist ROA, Resto, Chase, Remed, Flying Fortress, Zosen, Pez, Pixel Pancho, and the Mexican artists Dhear and Smithe. With Chase he painted walls in Los Angeles and in Zagreb, where they spent hours looking for a homeowner who would agree to a mural. In 2011 and 2012 he took part in the White Canvas Project in the United Kingdom, run by the streetwear label Supremebeing.

There are several of his walls in Ghent. He painted one on Ketelvest with ROA and Resto, and a school entrance on Schoolkaai with Mazu Prozak, Sheryo and Jamz. In 2012 the owner of a Ghent building painted over one of his murals; Bué had asked the wrong person for permission. On Facebook, people then argued over whether painting over it was itself vandalism. In 2017 he took part in The Crystal Ship street art festival in Ostend, where he painted a triptych with the Buck collective and hid small birds around the city for visitors to find.

In 2014 the Belgian publisher Lannoo brought out a 224-page book of his work, with text in English and Spanish and a preface by the street art writer Tristan Manco.

=== Mexico ===
Bué's mural in the dining room of Lalo! in Colonia Roma, Mexico City (2015)

Bué first visited Mexico in 2007. In 2012 he said that he wanted to settle there for good in a few years' time, for the weather and for the way daily life there is lived outdoors, on the street. In January 2013 he was about to leave for Mexico for several months. He emigrated in 2015.

In 2014 he painted the characters that cover the main wall of Lalo!, the restaurant of the chef Eduardo "Lalo" García on Calle Zacatecas in Colonia Roma, which opened that November. When it opened, Chilango called the wall the restaurant's star attraction, one that diners would want a selfie in front of. Coolhunter noted that the characters can be seen from the street and seem to invite passers-by in to join the meal. Forbes México later described the walls as "very pop".

In Mexico City he opened Holly Waffles, a waffle place and art gallery in one, on Calle Milán in Colonia Juárez. The waffles were made from his great-grandmother's recipe. He has also sold his work at farmers' markets there. Plans for a second location in Reno, Nevada were put on hold during the COVID-19 pandemic; by 2021 Holly's Waffles was operating out of Z Bar in Midtown Reno. In Reno he also painted a mural with Hannah Eddy.

== Design and apps ==
Bué's characters also appear on toys, plush toys, caps and T-shirts. He designed prints for LinFashion, a label sold at Barneys New York; he has said that its clothes were worn by Heidi Klum, Steffi Graf and Chrisette Michele. He also designed for the Belgian children's clothing line Toykyo Kids.

He co-founded HeyHey Apps, a maker of apps for children, with Stefan Vandegehuchte and Pieter van der Helst. Its iPad app HeyHey Colours lets children colour in his street drawings. He also designed the skull label for Yugen's Grapefruit Hops drink.

== Gallery ==
Remember who you are, Ghent (2011)

Emile Seghersplein, Ghent (2012)

Ziniastraat, Ghent (2013)

Blekerijstraat, Ghent (2013)

Birds by ROA and Bué

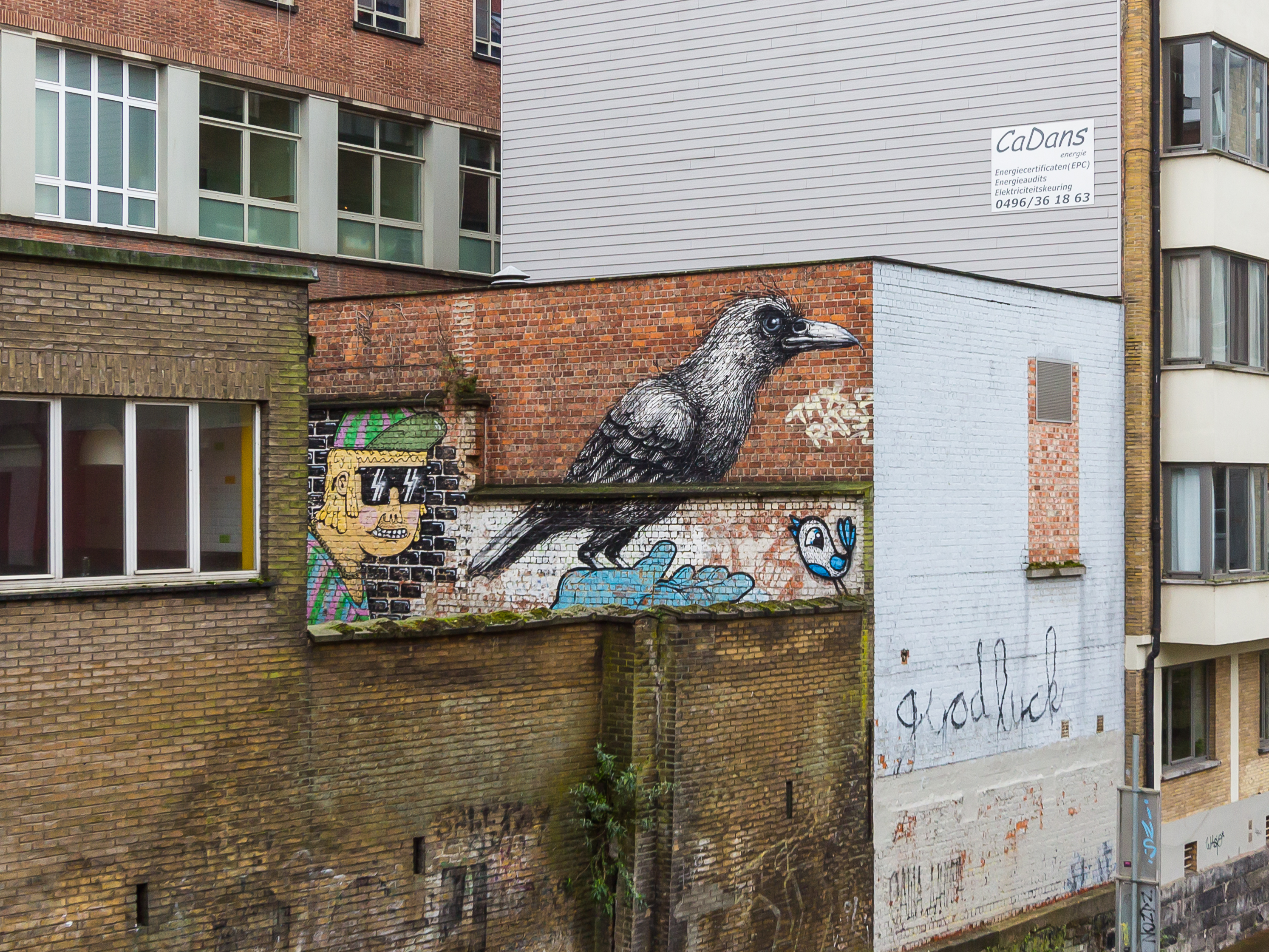
With ROA and Resto on Ketelvest, Ghent

Kongostraat, Ghent
