= The Robey =

Northwest Tower
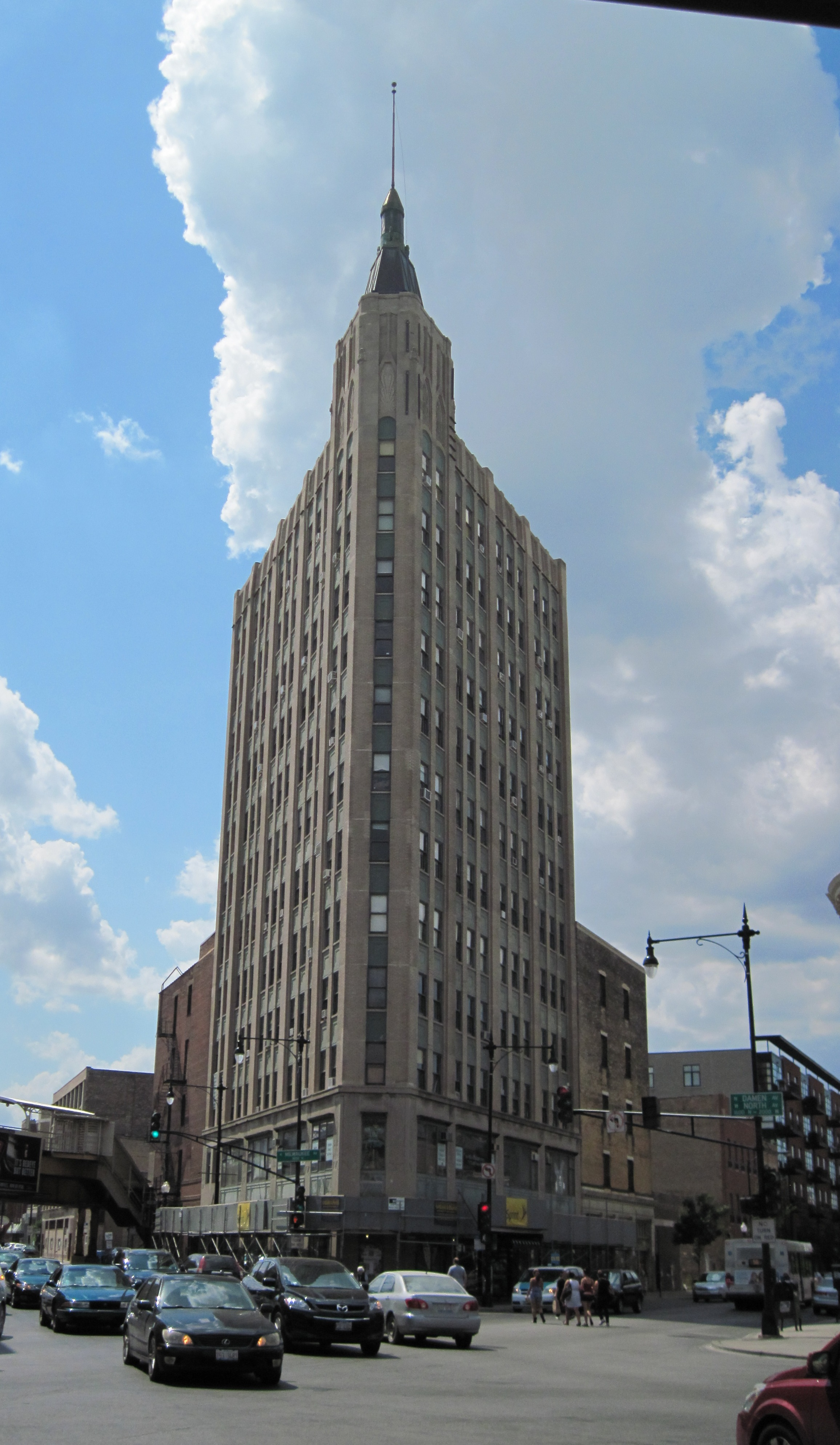
- Interactive map of the Northwest Tower area
- Alternative names: Coyote Building, Robey Hotel

General information
- Type: Hotel
- Architectural style: Art Deco
- Location: 2018 W. North Avenue, at Damen Avenue and Milwaukee Avenue, Wicker Park, Chicago, Illinois, United States
- Coordinates: 41.9106°N 87.6782°W
- Current tenants: The Robey Chicago
- Year built: 1928–1929
- Renovated: 2015–2017

Height
- Height: 203 feet (62 m)

Design and construction
- Architect: Perkins, Chatten & Hammond

Other information
- Number of stores: 12

The Robey (formerly known as Northwest Tower and the Coyote Building) is a 12-story Art Deco hotel at the corner of North Avenue and Milwaukee Avenue in Wicker Park, Chicago. It was designed by Perkins, Chatten & Hammond and built between 1928 and 1929.

== Overview ==
The Robey is one of the first skyscrapers in Chicago to have been constructed outside the downtown area. The tower was built on the site of the Noel State Bank, near the Damen stop on the Chicago "L", at the intersection of Damen, North and Milwaukee Avenues. Milwaukee Avenue runs northwest through Chicago’s grid of streets, creating intersections that often have a “flatiron” or wedge-shaped building on one corner, like this building.

It was originally marketed to attorneys, doctors, and other professionals. In the 1980s, it became home to the Tower Coyote Gallery, reportedly named because artists thought the building resembled a howling coyote. Over the next two decades, the surrounding neighborhood held an annual arts festival called Around the Coyote. In 2008, the Chicago Zoning Board approved plans to convert the building into a hotel, but financial difficulties prevented the building's owner from moving ahead with the project.

Renovation as a hotel began in 2015 and ended in 2017 when it opened as the Robey Hotel, with its address at 2018 W. North Avenue. Robey Street was an early name for Damen Avenue. The Grupo Habita did the design of the renovation and operates the hotel. The building received praise for its use of “layering” interior designs of rooms and restaurants from all the decades of the building’s history. The warehouse on the adjacent lot was renovated to include a swimming pool and gym.

== Hotel ==
In 2012, the property was purchased by a venture backed by Don Wilson and AJ Capita with the intent to renovate the property into a boutique hotel. The Robey hotel is named after the prior street name for Damen Avenue, offers 69 rooms and Cafe Robey serving French-American cuisine. The hotel is operated by Grupo Habita, a Mexico-based hotel group with 14 hotels in Mexico and one in New York.

== Renovation ==
From 2015 to 2017, Northwest Tower was renovated by the Chicago-based Antunovich Associates as the architect of record, design work by Brussels offices of Nicolas Schuybroek Architects, and interior work by Marc Merckx Interiors.
