= Lalo García (chef) =

Mexican chef and restaurateur (born 1977)

- Born: Eduardo García Guzmán; 1977 (age 48–49); San José de las Pilas, Acámbaro, Guanajuato, Mexico
- Spouse: Gabriela López
- Culinary career
- Cooking style: Mexican cuisine with French technique
- Current restaurants
- Máximo; Lalo; Havre 77

Eduardo García Guzmán (born 1977), known as Lalo García, is a Mexican chef and restaurateur. With his wife, Gabriela López, he founded the Mexico City restaurant Máximo (originally Máximo Bistrot), which received a Michelin star in 2025, and a group of restaurants run as partnerships with former employees. García spent his childhood as a migrant farmworker in the United States and learned to cook in restaurant kitchens in Atlanta before being imprisoned and twice deported; he is one of Mexico City's best-known chefs, and his life is the subject of Laura Tillman's 2023 biography The Migrant Chef.

== Early life ==
García was born in 1977 in San José de las Pilas, a hamlet in the mountains of the municipality of Acámbaro, Guanajuato, near the border with Michoacán. As a small child he worked in the family's milpa and in a brickworks in the village. In 1987, when he was about ten, he crossed into the United States with his mother and brother to join his father, a migrant laborer; accounts of his age differ, and García has also said he began working in the fields at five. For several years the family followed the harvests along the East Coast, picking oranges in Florida, onions in Georgia, pickling cucumbers in Ohio, apples in Michigan and mushrooms in Pennsylvania. García never attended school. By the age of eight he was cooking simple meals at home for the family.

== Career in the United States ==
In 1991, when García was 14, the family settled in Atlanta. He took a job washing dishes at the Georgia Grille on Peachtree Road, using a false Social Security number because he was too young to work legally, and within six months was moved to the salad station. A Puerto Rican cook there recommended him to Brasserie Le Coze, opened by Eric Ripert and the owners of New York's Le Bernardin, where he spent about three years working his way through the kitchen stations, from garde manger to meat. He then cooked at a restaurant in Alpharetta, where he was offered the post of sous chef, and began studying the cookbooks of chefs such as Charlie Trotter and Charlie Palmer.

By his own account, at this time he also sold drugs to restaurant dishwashers, though he was never caught. Shortly before his 19th birthday, he drove his cousin and a friend to a liquor store they robbed. Police traced his car, and he turned himself in. Convicted of aggravated assault, he spent a year in county jail and three years in Smith State Prison in Georgia. At the end of 2000 he was deported to Mexico. When his mother told him that his father had cancer, he crossed the border again without authorization, two weeks later by his account to The New York Times and about six months later according to El País.

During his second stay, which lasted about six years, García worked under false documents. He became executive chef of Van Gogh's, a restaurant in the Atlanta suburbs, and then led the kitchens of Pure, a taquería group, while supporting his parents; his father died during this period, and his son Máximo was born. In 2007 immigration agents detained him at work. After four months in federal custody in Georgia he was deported again, with a warning that any further unauthorized return could mean up to 20 years in federal prison. He has not seen his son since.

== Mexico City ==
After being refused entry to Canada and failing to find work he wanted in Los Cabos, García contacted the chef Enrique Olvera, who hired him at Pujol in Mexico City. He worked there as chef de cuisine for about three years and met his future wife, Gabriela López, who also worked for Olvera. The couple then worked for a time in Yelapa, near Puerto Vallarta, before returning to Mexico City to open a restaurant of their own.

=== Máximo ===
García and López opened Máximo Bistrot, named after his son, in November 2011 on Tonalá Street in Colonia Roma, with four employees and 13 tables. López's father paid the deposit on the premises, and a cousin and an uncle sent money from the United States. Its cooking applied French technique to seasonal Mexican ingredients; The Wall Street Journal credited García with "modernizing Mexico City's food scene with accessible, chic, hyper-seasonal dishes". The critic Alonso Ruvalcaba surveyed its early reception in Letras Libres in 2012.

On 26 April 2013 Andrea Benítez, daughter of Humberto Benítez Treviño, head of the federal consumer protection agency PROFECO, complained on Twitter after the restaurant would not seat her ahead of other diners. Hours later, agency inspectors suspended the restaurant's operations. The press dubbed her "Lady Profeco". The restaurant reopened on 3 May, and on 15 May the government announced that President Enrique Peña Nieto had ordered Benítez Treviño's removal.

Máximo was ranked 41st on Latin America's 50 Best Restaurants in 2015. In 2019, before the move, García published a book about the restaurant, its recipes and its suppliers, in a run of 3,000 copies in Spanish and 1,000 in English. In July 2020 the restaurant moved to a larger site on Avenida Álvaro Obregón, since when it has been known simply as Máximo, and in 2025 it received a Michelin star.

=== Other restaurants ===
In 2014 García and López opened Lalo!, a less expensive restaurant across the street from Máximo. The couple, who had studied pizza-making in Naples, originally conceived it as an Italian-inspired pizzeria, but its breakfasts proved so popular that they defined the restaurant for more than a decade. In 2026 they closed it for a complete renovation by the designer Charles de Lisle, who had also designed the original Lalo!, Máximo and Havre 77, and reopened it as an Italian restaurant serving fresh pasta and pizza for lunch and dinner. He also designed the menus of other restaurants, including De Mar a Mar, Cine Tonalá and Puebla 109. By 2017 the couple also ran Havre 77, a French bistro in Colonia Juárez, and employed about 130 people, with partnerships in Mexico, London and Dubai.

By 2024 García and López headed a group of eleven restaurants and bars, Grupo Maximus. The group has no outside investors: new restaurants are financed from the existing ones and run as partnerships with current or former employees. One of them, Em, led by Lucho Martínez, has held a Michelin star since the first Mexican guide in 2024. In 2026 the couple's own restaurants were Máximo, Lalo, Havre 77 and the bakery Panadería Gala. The group's members in 2024 included:

- Máximo (García and López)
- Lalo (García and López)
- Panadería Gala (García and López)
- Havre 77 (García and López)
- Em (Lucho Martínez and Fernanda Torres)
- 686 Bar (Martínez and Torres)
- Ultramarinos Demar (Martínez and Torres)
- Martínez (Martínez and Torres)
- Café Tormenta (Martínez and Torres)
- Makan (Maryann Yong and Mario Alváez)
- Café de Nadie (Pablo Usobiaga, Santiago Guerreiro and Billy Castro)

== Personal life ==
García is married to Gabriela López, his business partner, who runs the administration of their restaurants. He remains barred from returning to the United States. Drawing on his own childhood, he works with Save the Children on programs for migrant children.

== In literature ==
The journalist Laura Tillman, who followed García for several years, published The Migrant Chef: The Life and Times of Lalo García (W. W. Norton, 2023). The New Yorker described it as a wide-ranging biography that traces his path from deportee to a chef devoted to local ingredients and transparent supply chains.
