= Grupo Habita =

Mexican boutique hotel developer and operator

- Type: Private
- Industry: Lodging
- Founded: 2000
- Founder: Moisés Micha and Carlos Couturier
- Headquarters: Mexico City, Mexico
- Area served: Mexico and the United States
- Services: Lodging
- Website: http://www.grupohabita.mx/

Grupo Habita is a boutique hotel developer-operator based in Mexico City that owns hotels across Mexico and several in the United States.

== History ==
Grupo Habita was founded in 1994 by Moisés Micha and Carlos Couturier, and opened its first hotel in 2000, called Habita Hotel and located in Mexico City.

=== Hotels ===
Azul Histórico in the courtyard of the Downtown hotel

Afterward, Grupo Habita expanded its base and established 13 hotels across Mexico, with its most notable and praised property, Downtown, in Mexico City. Its courtyard is home to Azul Histórico, the Centro location of the Azul restaurants of chef Ricardo Muñoz Zurita. It opened in early 2012. The company later started branching into the United States.

One of its hotels, Deseo, has been described as playing a crucial part in making the Playa del Carmen region of Mexico a hot spot for tourism.

In 2011, the firm opened its first U.S. property, a hotel called Hôtel Americano in the Chelsea neighborhood of Manhattan in New York City. This hotel is Grupo Habita's largest, with 56 rooms.

Grupo Habita's hotels have been described by observers as being excellent for younger travelers.

The group operates the Robey Hotel in Chicago's Wicker Park that opened in 2017.

In 2016 it also expressed an interest in opening a hotel in the Stockade District of Kingston, New York, a historic Hudson Valley city north of New York City that is fast becoming a cultural hot spot, with a large local hipster culture, a strong arts community and a vibrant nightlife.
