= El Comité 1973 =

El Comité 1973 is a Mexican bimonthly magazine.

== History ==
=== Founding ===
The magazine was created by Meneses Monroy who is its director. The current editor is Erasmus W. Newmann, and Jovany Cruz is in charge of graphic design. The magazine also has an editorial board, composed of a number of writers and poets.

The date is due to the date of death of poet Pablo Neruda
