= Avenida Álvaro Obregón =

Street in Mexico City

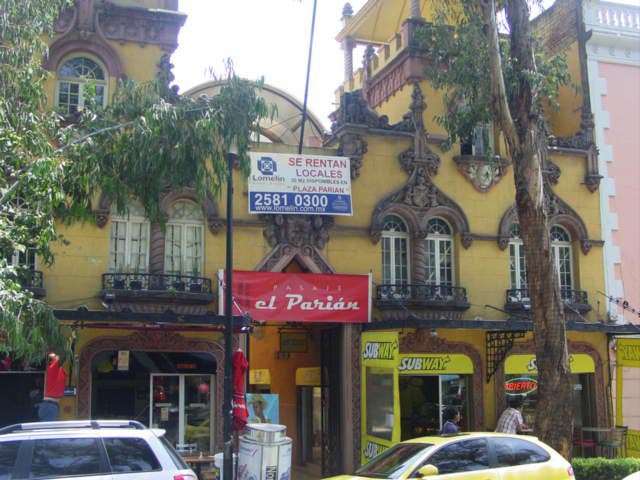
El Parián Commercial Passage

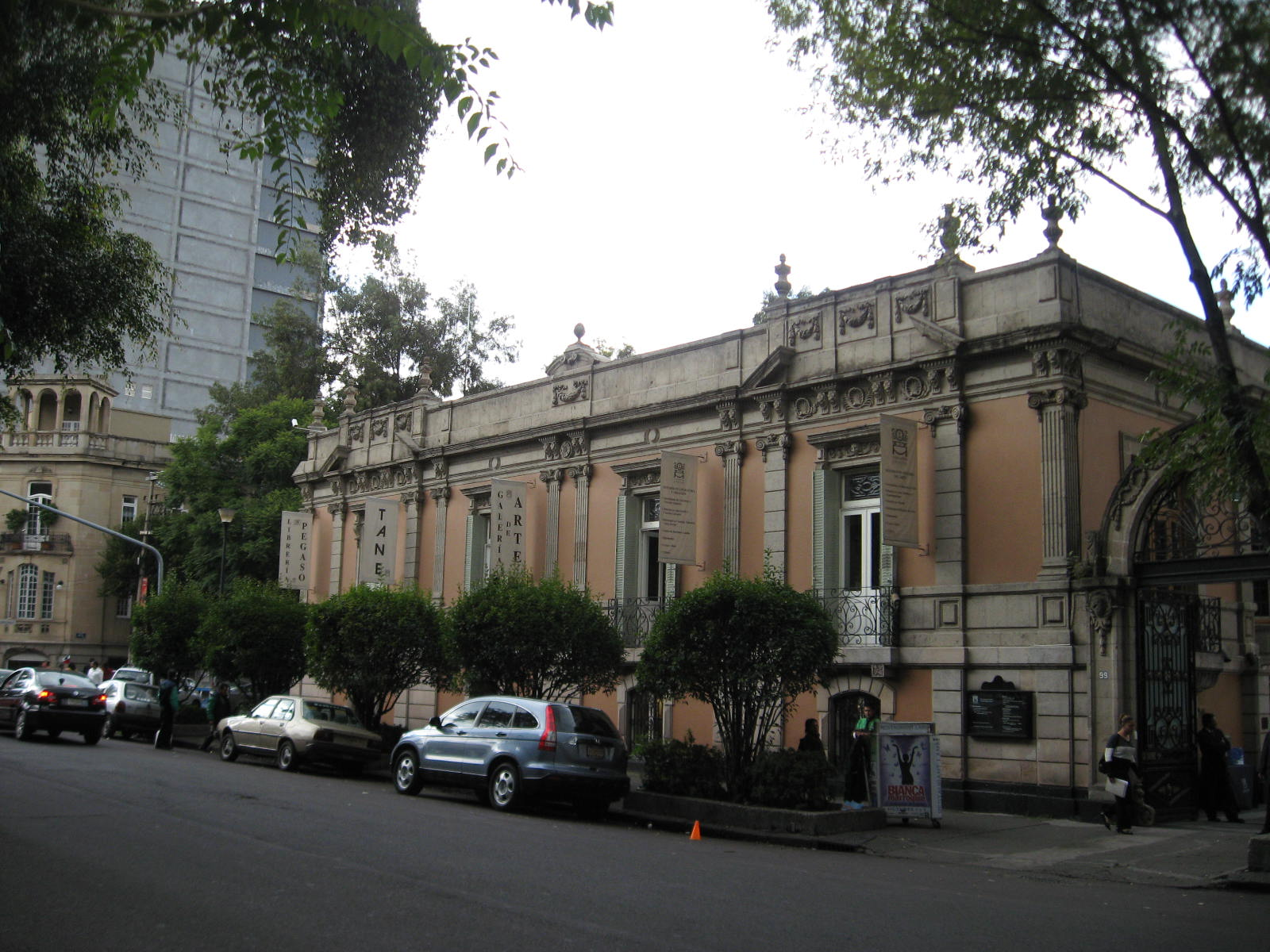
Casa Lamm Cultural Center

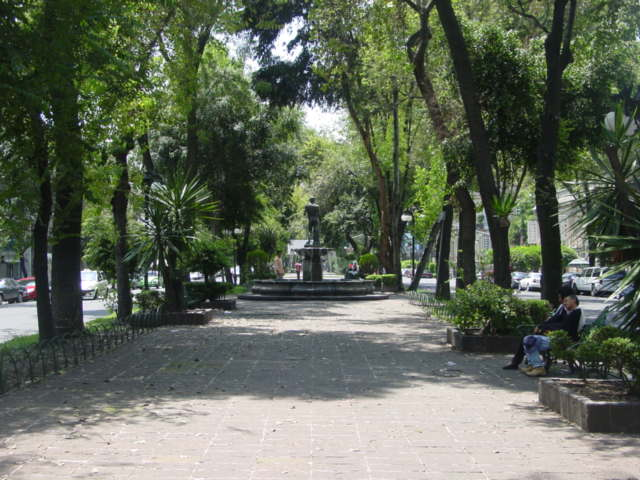
Park median in Avenida Álvaro Obregón

Avenida Álvaro Obregón is an avenue in the Roma district of Mexico City, divided by a park median along which fountains are located with characters from Roman and Greek mythology.

There was a well known street market of art and antiques along the median, but this was eliminated in 2012. The median continues to be the site of various cultural events, including exhibitions of art, organic and natural product fairs, etc.

The avenue has several restaurants, such as Máximo, La Docena, Cocina Conchita, Scimmia Legno Pizza, Mónica Patiño's Delirio, Bacoa, Pisto y Ahumados and bars such as Limantour, Félix and Departamento.

Casa Lamm Cultural Center and the El Parián Commercial Passage are both located along the avenue.

== Gallery ==
=== Fountains ===
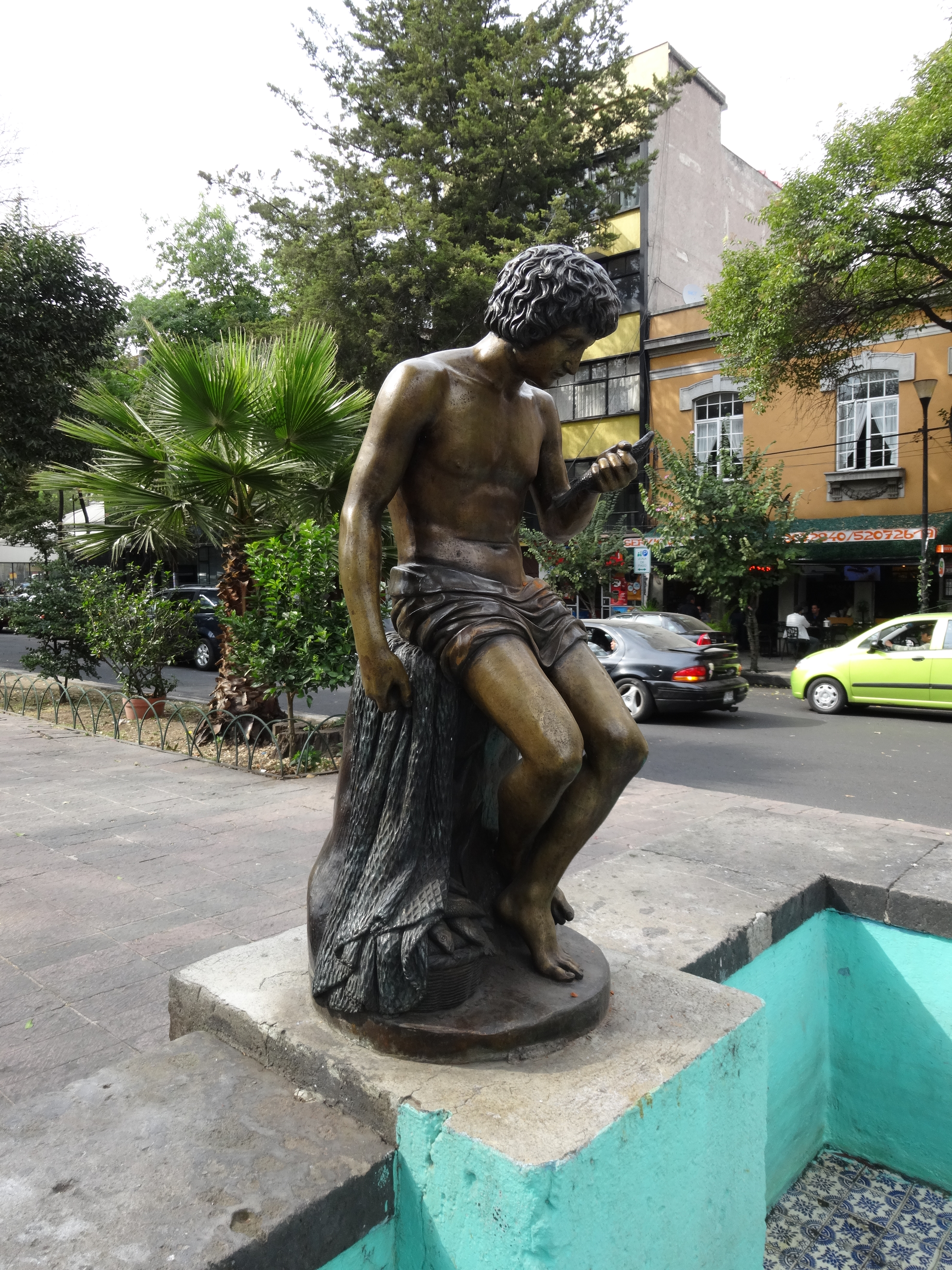

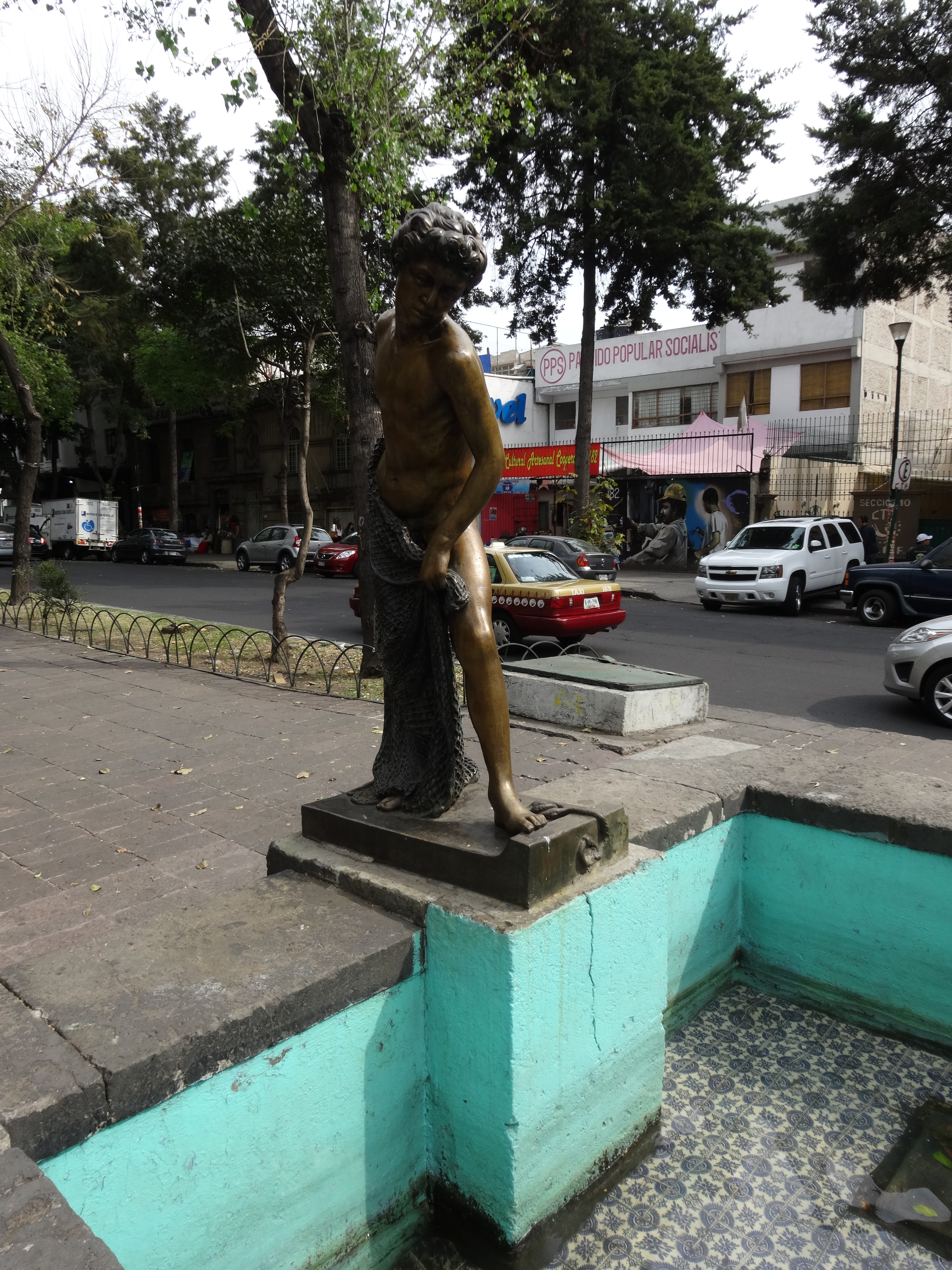

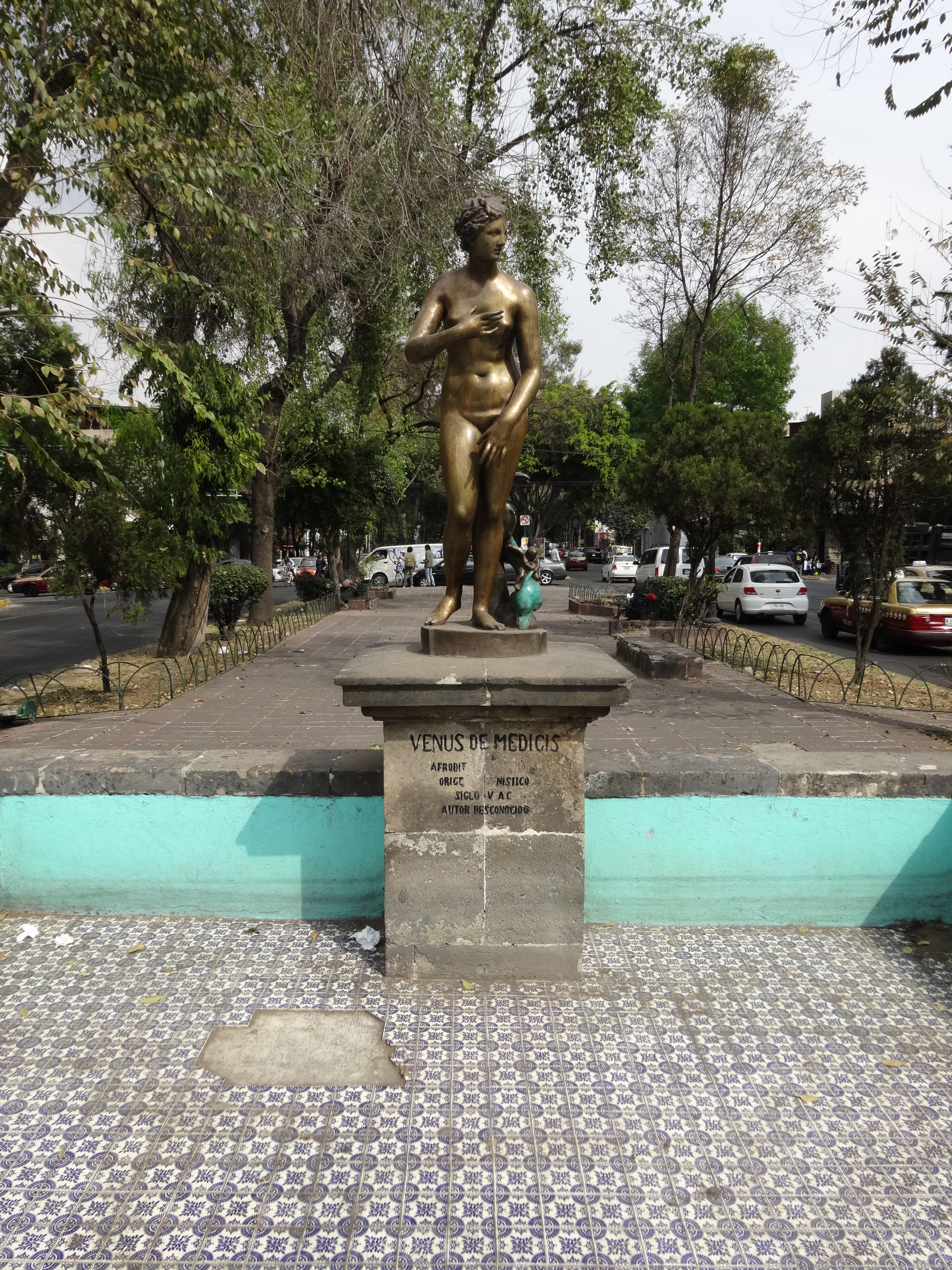

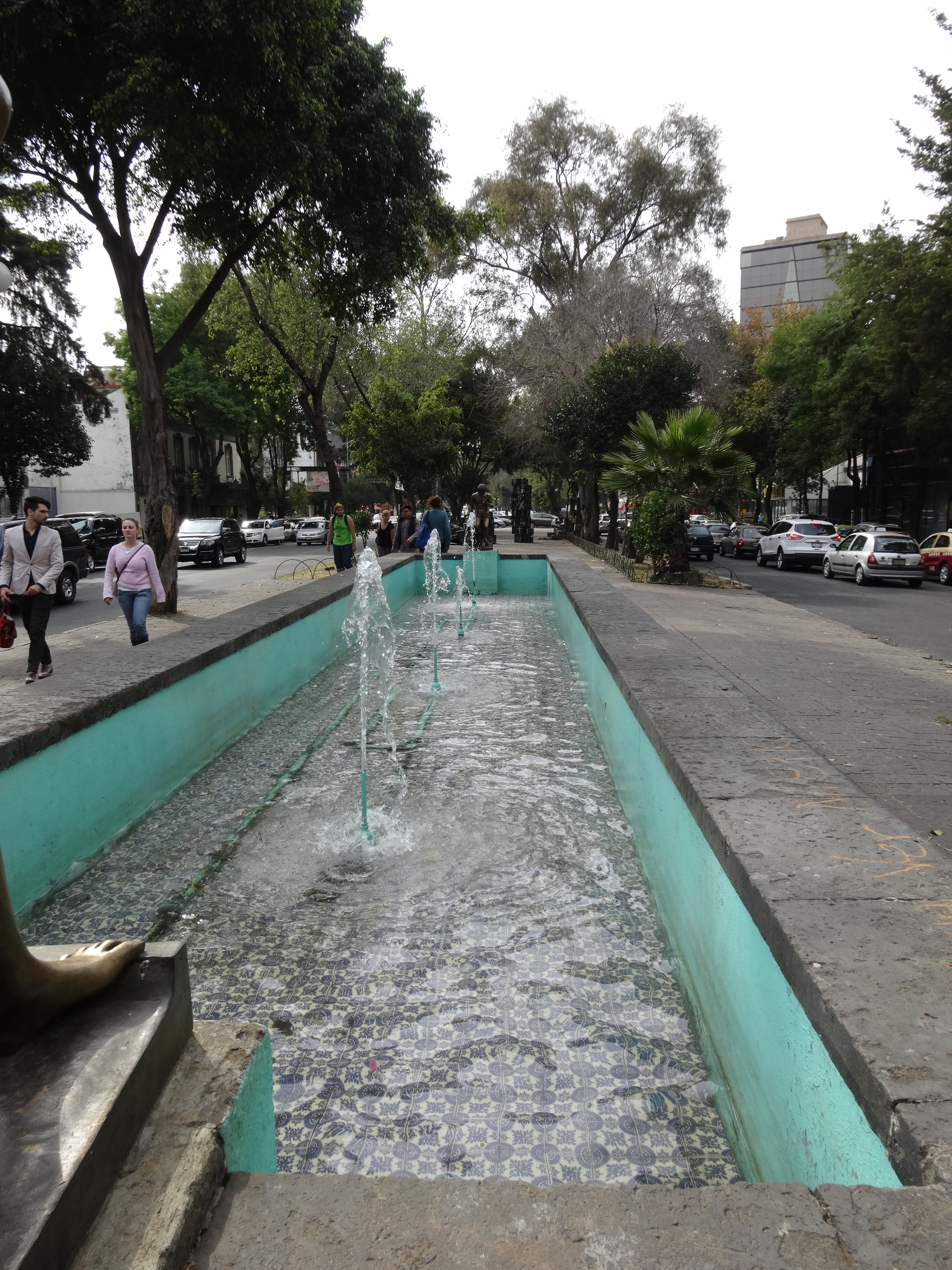

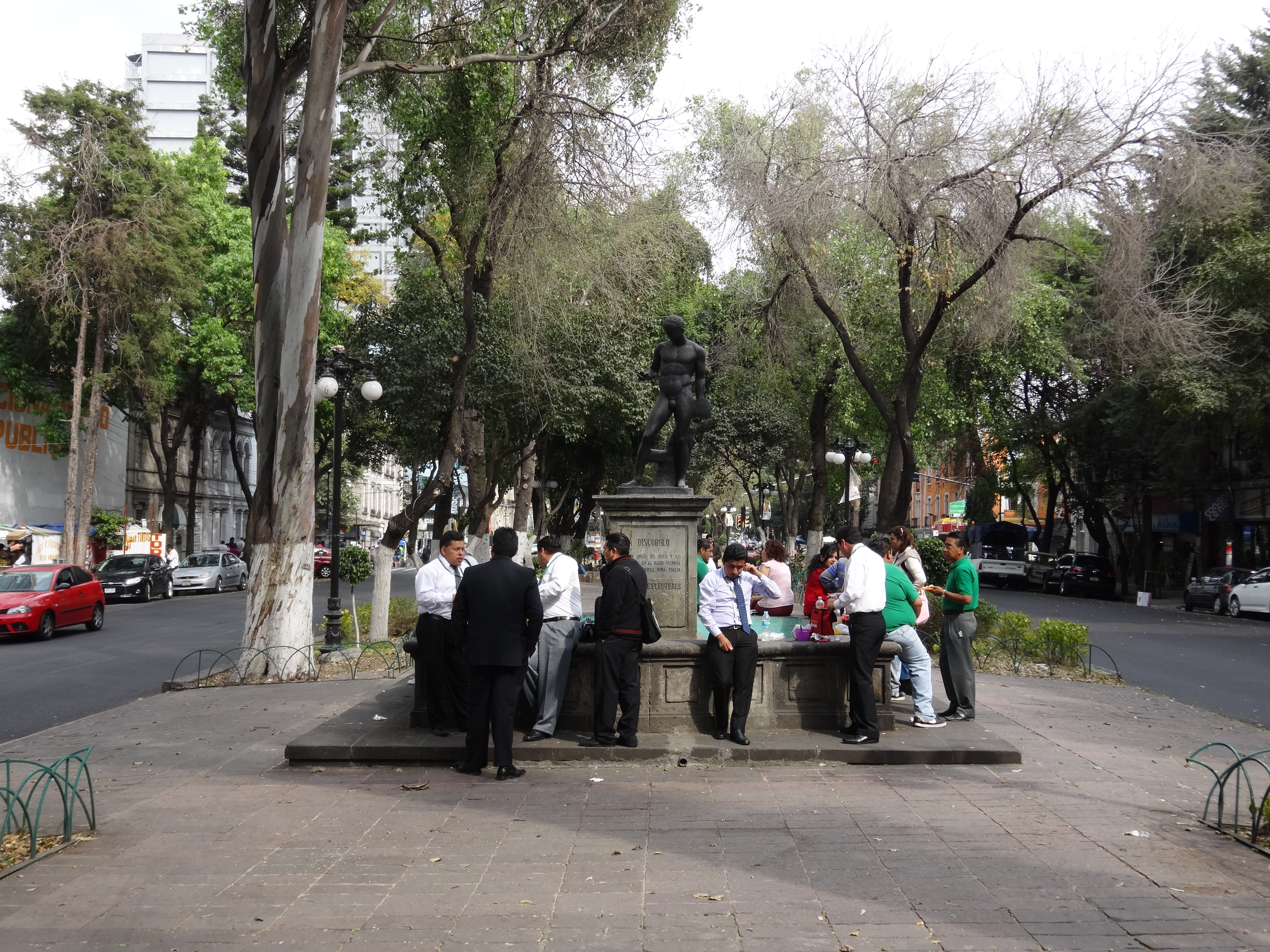
