= Máximo (restaurant) =

Restaurant in Mexico City, Mexico

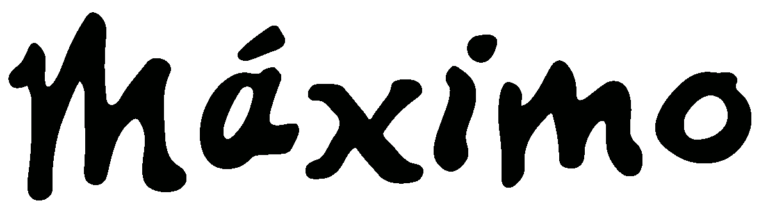

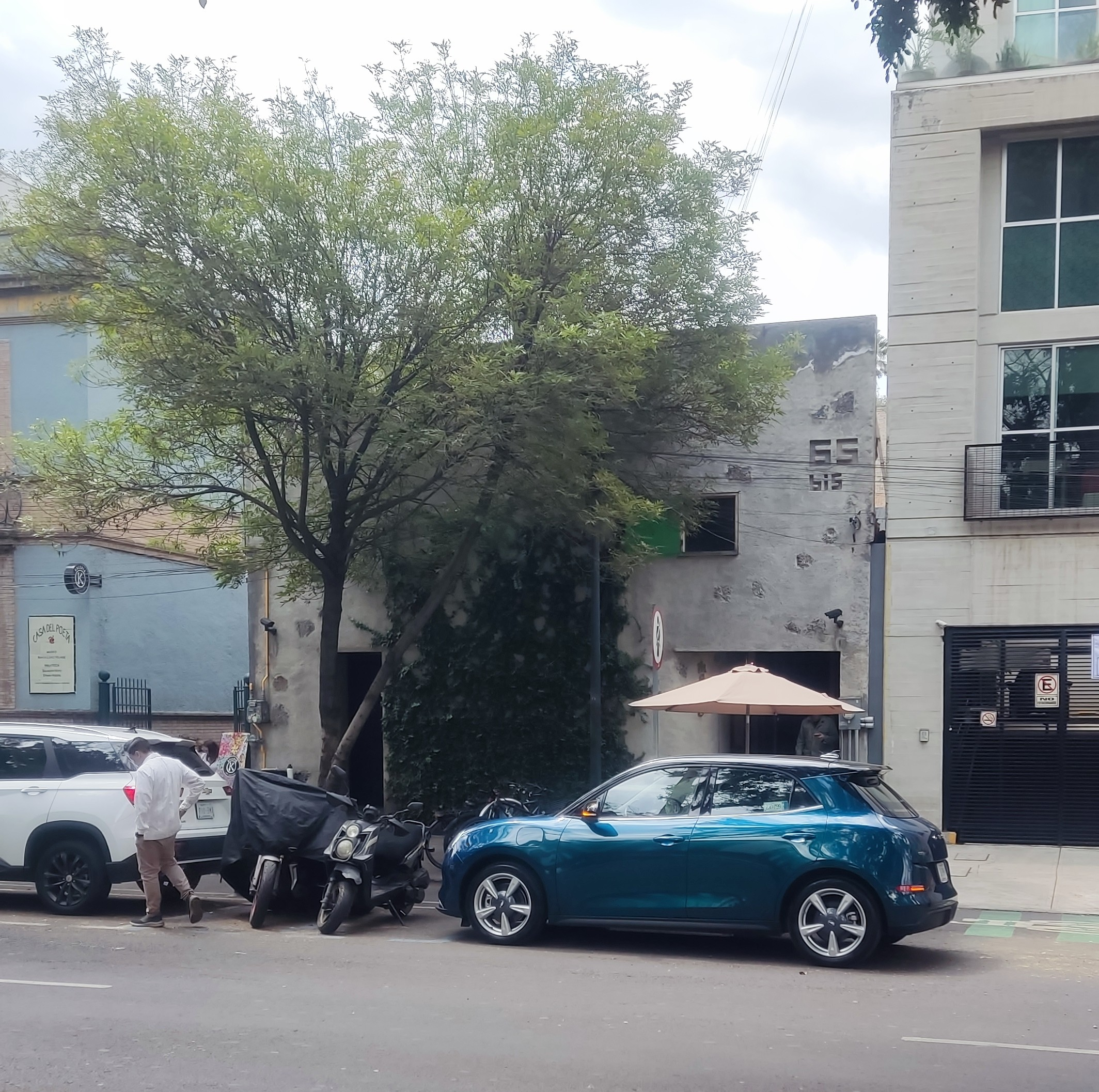
- The restaurant's exterior, 2025
- Interactive map of Máximo

Restaurant information
- Established: 30 November 2011; 14 years ago
- Owners: Eduardo "Lalo" García and Gabriela López
- Head chef: Lalo García
- Pastry chef: Guadalupe Palmira Sánchez Pérez (2021)
- Food type: Mexican; French
- Rating: (Michelin Guide, 2025)
- Location: Avenida Álvaro Obregón 65 Bis, Roma, Cuauhtémoc, Mexico City, 06700, Mexico
- Coordinates: 19°25′8″N 99°09′29″W
- Reservations: Yes
- Other information: Nearest station: Álvaro Obregón bus station
- Website: maximobistrot.com.mx

Máximo, originally Máximo Bistrot, is a restaurant in Mexico City. It was founded in 2011 by the chef Eduardo "Lalo" García and the restaurateur Gabriela López. The diner offers dishes made with seasonal Mexican ingredients, inspired by French culinary techniques. For example, it has served crisp-skinned trout with clams, escamoles with Comté cheese, or soft-shell crab tlayudas with guacamole.

Máximo Bistrot opened with four employees in a small space on Tonalá Street, in Colonia Roma, featuring a tricolored cement mosaic floor and a tree of life sculpture where candles replaced traditional biblical figures. The restaurant earned praise for emphasizing a farm-to-table concept, sourcing local ingredients, providing affordable dining, and offering a menu that changed daily—an approach likened to that of a bistro, later introducing a tasting menu. In 2013, it became the focus of national controversy when the daughter of the consumer protection chief of Mexico's Procuraduría Federal del Consumidor (PROFECO) attempted to bypass the reservation system, prompting a temporary closure by PROFECO inspectors. The incident sparked public backlash over abuse of power, leading to the chief's dismissal and sanctioning of several officials.

In 2020, Máximo Bistrot moved to a larger location on Avenida Álvaro Obregón, rebranding simply as Máximo. The new space included an expanded kitchen, enabling the restaurant to refine its offerings. Housed in a building with an industrial aesthetic, the establishment has a warehouse-style arched ceiling. Despite the delay caused by the COVID-19 pandemic, the establishment grew to employ 120 people that year. In 2021, The World's 50 Best Restaurants gave the eatery an award for its business model reinvention. In 2025, Máximo received one Michelin star in the second Michelin Guide covering Mexico.

== Description ==
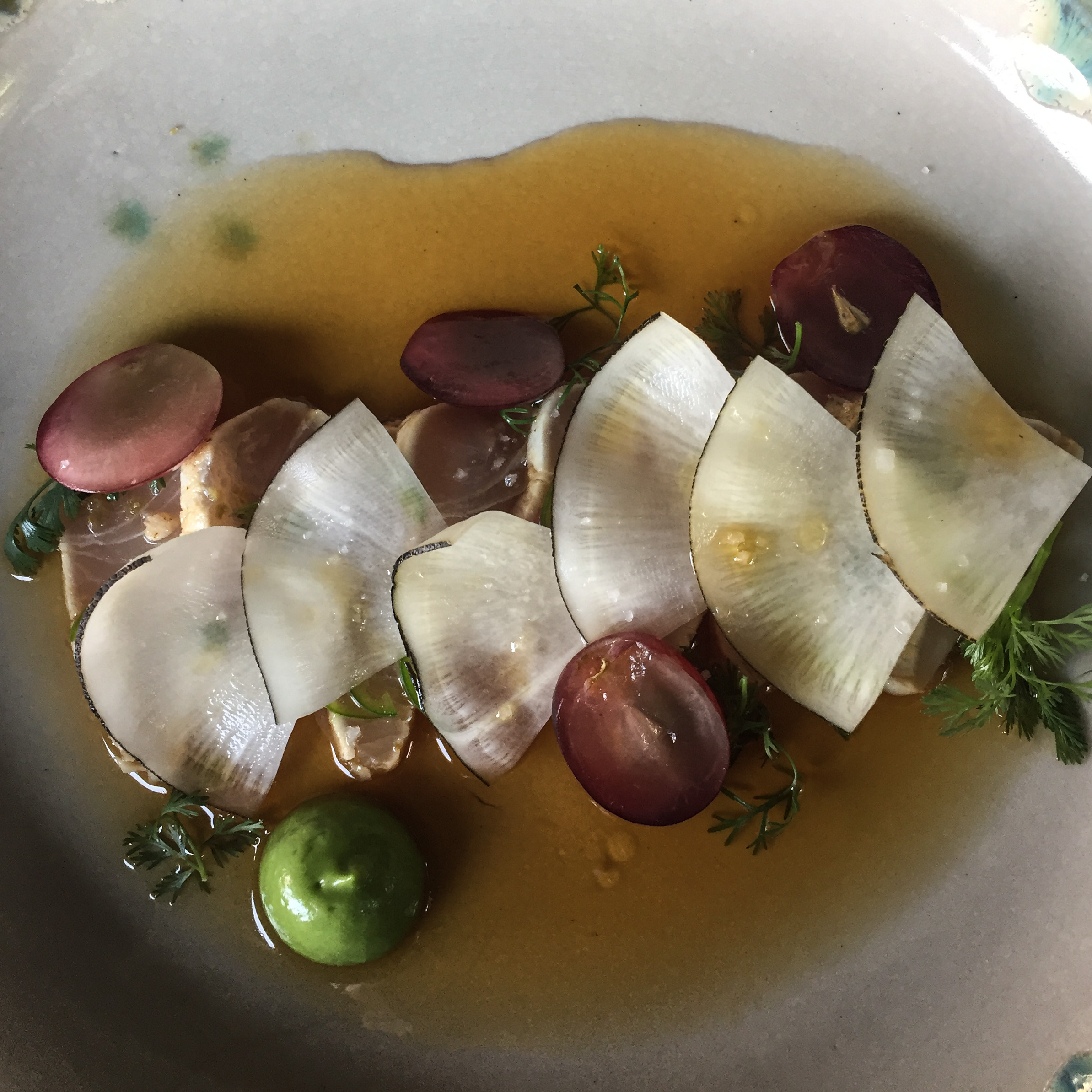
Kanpachi with cilantro, grapes, radish and avocado in dashi

Máximo is located along Avenida Álvaro Obregón. Its building has an industrial design, and the restaurant's name appears in gold lettering on the exterior. Upon entering, guests pass through a hallway that leads into a dining area bordered by the kitchen.

The interior features a warehouse-style arched ceiling that allows natural light to fill the room and white walls coated with a mixture of fermented nopal and lime. Red tiles cover the floor and are also used in the kitchen and bathrooms, creating visual continuity throughout the space. Next to the bar, there is a structure with a tiled roof inspired by Ohio barns. The furniture, made from Mexican yellow pine, reflects a Nordic design aesthetic. A tree stands at the far end of the dining area, serving as a natural focal point. The interior design, furniture, and tableware were created by the American design firm Charles de Lisle, with the tableware produced by the Suro factory in Guadalajara.

Máximo is located near the Álvaro Obregón bus station. It requires reservations and offers a daily and a tasting menu, both drawing inspiration from French cuisine reinterpreted through seasonal Mexican ingredients. For example, in 2012, the restaurant had dishes such as tuna, Atlantic wreckfish, and clam callus sourced from Puerto Ángel, Oaxaca. Vegetables were cultivated in the chinampas of Xochimilco, in southern Mexico City.

Writing for Condé Nast Traveler, reporter and critic Scarlett Lindeman noted that the menu reflected a farm-to-table concept. Her report described dishes like crisp-skinned trout with clams, peas, and wild spinach, as well as chicken liver served with cherries. A reporter from El Financiero mentioned additional options such as lamb birria, octopus ceviche, lamb loin with smoked eggplant purée, and rosemary juice. The same journalist also described a banana bread with caviar, a lamb birria sincronizada, escamoles with Comté cheese, grilled northern red snapper, Wagyu beef, criollo plum sorbet, and a passion fruit and mango tartlet.

Writing in El Universal, Omar Moreno also highlighted other dishes, including macadamia and banana bread, soft-shell crab tlayudas with guacamole salsa mixed with shiso, a roasted rack of pork with rosemary and apple juice, and charcoal-grilled Wagyu cross rib eye.

== History ==
Eduardo "Lalo" García was born in Mexico around 1977. During childhood, his family migrated to California illegally, where he began to work in restaurants as a dishwasher. In the 1990s, he faced legal issues for aiding in a robbery and was deported in 2000. He returned to the U.S. later, and his son, Maximus Alexander, was born around 2003. García found work at a restaurant in Georgia, where he was promoted to chef. In 2007, he was deported again and has been permanently barred from re-entering.

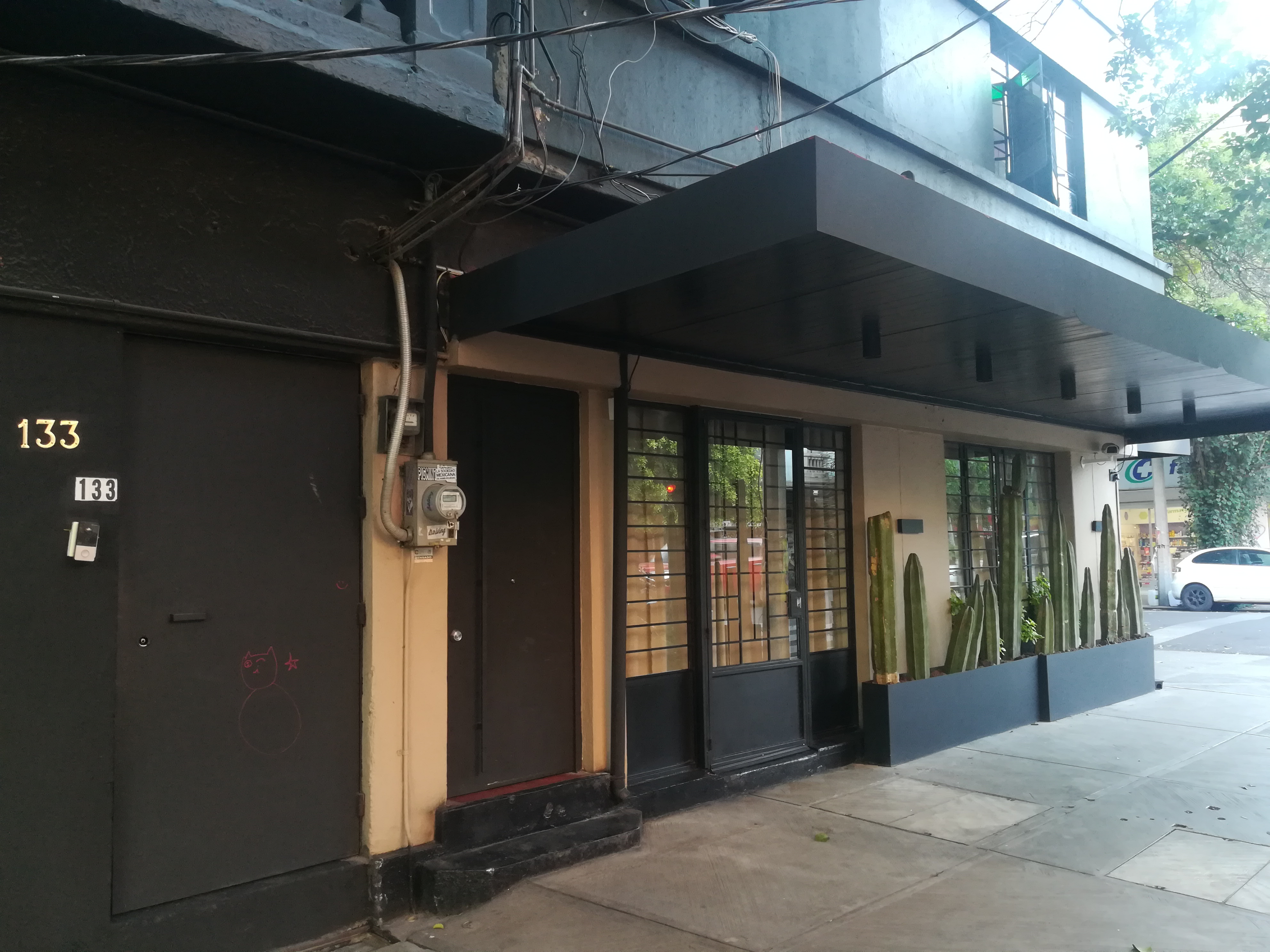
Exterior of Em (pictured in 2026), which operated in the building previously occupied by Máximo.

After his second deportation, he settled in Los Cabos Municipality, Baja California Sur, before relocating to Mexico City. There, he met Enrique Olvera, who hired him as head chef at Pujol upon learning about his previous role at the restaurant in Georgia. García worked at Pujol from 2007 to 2010, during which time he met his wife, Gabriela López. In 2011, he secured a loan from his uncle and, together with López, opened Máximo Bistrot on 30 November 2011 along Tonalá Street in Colonia Roma, in the Cuauhtémoc borough, with a team of four employees. He chose the name inspired by his belief in a past life during the Viking Age or Roman Empire.

In a 2012 review for Letras Libres, Alonso Ruvalcaba compiled several contemporary critiques describing the food at Máximo Bistrot as prepared with high-quality, seasonal, and straightforward Mexican ingredients. He noted that the menu changed daily and likened the restaurant's approach to that of a fonda or bistro, modest and affordable eateries. Reviewers also described the décor as minimalist, featuring a tricolored cement mosaic floor, furniture inspired by the architect Luis Barragán, and a tree of life sculpture in which candles replaced traditional biblical figures. The tables, chairs, and benches were crafted from mesquite wood and manufactured in Dolores Hidalgo, Guanajuato.

On 2 July 2020, Máximo Bistrot relocated to a larger space in the same neighborhood on Avenida Álvaro Obregón, in a building previously occupied by an automobile repair shop and a pool hall. García and López chose the location partly because its kitchen matched the size of the former restaurant's. It offered upgraded facilities, including grills, a smoker, stoves, ovens, a cold room, and industrial extractors—all of which had been absent from the original location. The move was initially scheduled for March 2020 but was delayed due to the onset of the COVID-19 pandemic in Mexico. By 2020, the restaurant also shortened its name to Máximo as part of a business model reinvention, which García said allowed for greater complexity and refinement in the dishes than those served at the former location. Around this time, it had employed approximately 120 people; as of August 2025, it employed 94 people.

=== "#LadyPROFECO" incident ===
On 27 April 2013, Andrea Benítez, daughter of Humberto Benítez Treviño, the then-head of Mexico's Office of the Federal Prosecutor for the Consumer (PROFECO), arrived at Máximo Bistrot without a reservation. After being informed by López that she would have to wait due to a list of existing reservations, Andrea became upset and reportedly threatened to shut down the restaurant—an action within PROFECO's authority. López declined to give her special treatment and upheld the restaurant's reservation policy. Later that day, PROFECO inspectors visited the restaurant and ordered its closure, citing an unclear reservation system and the absence of alcohol pencentages listed on the menu. Viewers criticized the widely circulated video as an abuse of power, triggering public outcry and calls for Benítez Treviño's resignation. Andrea was dubbed "#LadyPROFECO" on social media.

On 3 May, PROFECO removed the suspension seals, stating that authorities had not formally enforced the closure and that the restaurant remained closed at the owners' discretion. A few weeks later, President Enrique Peña Nieto ordered the dismissal of Benítez Treviño, carried out by Secretary of the Interior Miguel Ángel Osorio Chong. Six additional public servants were sanctioned for being involved.

== Reception ==
Scarlett Lindeman described the food as "refined and upscale", while noting that it maintained a bistro-style approach. A Time Out reviewer gave Máximo a five-star rating, praising its farm-to-table concept and calling the food "sophisticated without being pretentious". Mariana Camacho of The Infatuation recommended the tasting menu for first-time visitors, while Guillaume Guevara, from the same publication, suggested pairing it with wine. According to Lucille Renwick of Frommer's, García combines culinary skill with the belief that exceptional food should remain accessible.

According to Michael Parker Stainback in Afar, the dishes combine French culinary methods with seasonal native Mexican ingredients and the country's hospitable approach to sharing meals. Chantal Martineau characterized the space as "airy", emphasizing the French treatment of Mexican ingredients as well in her review for Sunset, and Claire Howorth praised its lively atmosphere and refined cocktails for Vanity Fair.

In 2021, Máximo received the Estrella Damm Chefs' Choice Award for Best Reinvention from The World's 50 Best Restaurants. Since 2022, the list has expanded to include restaurants ranked 51st to 100th. That year, the diner was placed 89th. It was voted the best international restaurant by Food & Wine magazine readers in 2023.

García and Máximo appeared in the Apple TV docuseries Knife Edge: Chasing Michelin Stars (2025), which follows chefs trying to achieve recognition from the Michelin Guide. Máximo received one Michelin star in 2025, meaning "high-quality cooking, worth a stop". The guide added: "While the bones of its industrial past are present, this chic Roma Norte restaurant's gorgeous space boasts white brick, tile, and soaring ceilings. It's breezy and beautiful". Miriam Lira of El Economista considered the awarding of the star a form of justice after it had not been granted in the first edition of the guide the previous year.

== See also ==
- List of French restaurants
- List of Mexican restaurants
- List of restaurants in Mexico

== Bibliography ==
- Armstrong, Kate; Bartlett, Ray; Butler, Stuart; Harrell, Ashley; Hecht, John; Kaminski, Anna; Masters, Tom; Prado, Liza; Richmond, Simon; St Louis, Regis; Tang, Phillip (2022). Lonely Planet Mexico 17. Lonely Planet. ISBN 9781787017160. OCLC 1294684977.
- Flynn, Sean; Hansche, Melanie; Yagoda, Maria (May 2023). "World's Best Restaurants". Food & Wine. Vol. 46, no. 4. ISSN 0741-9015.
- Howorth, Claire (February 2024). "Bohemian Rhapsody". Vanity Fair. Vol. 66, no. 2. ISSN 0733-8899.
- Martineau, Chantal (March 2016). "Your Guide to Mexico City". Sunset. Vol. 236, no. 3. ISSN 0039-5404.
