= Yelapa =

Yelapa Palapa
- Fishing town
- Nickname: Lapa
- Motto: Where two rivers meet
- Location in Mexico Yelapa (Mexico)
- Coordinates: 20°29′18″N 105°26′43″W
- Country: Mexico
- State: Jalisco
- Municipality: Cabo Corrientes
- Elevation: 1.2 m (3.9 ft)

Population
  - Total: 1,500
- Time zone: UTC-7 (Central Time Zone)

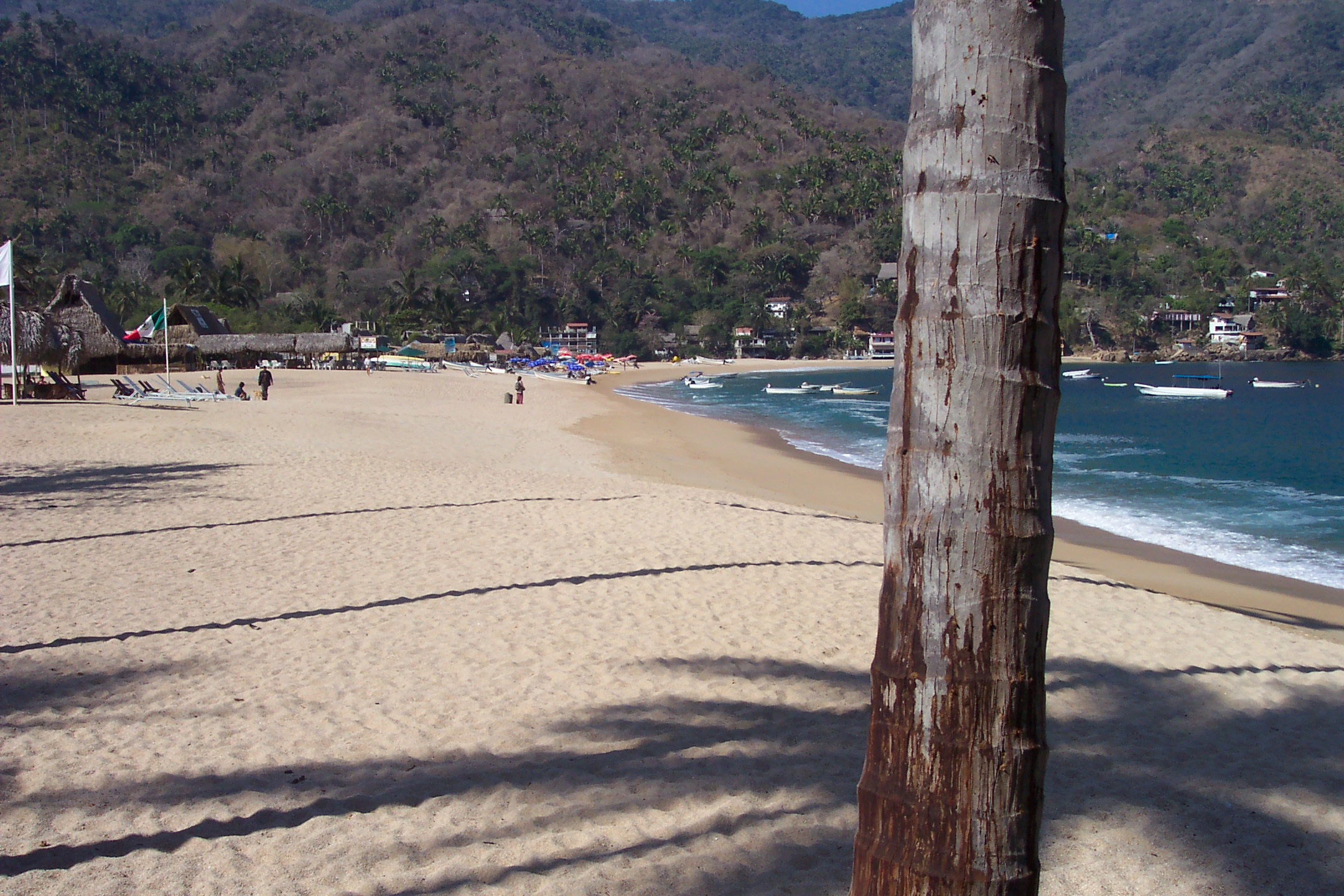
Beach shot Yelapa, Mexico

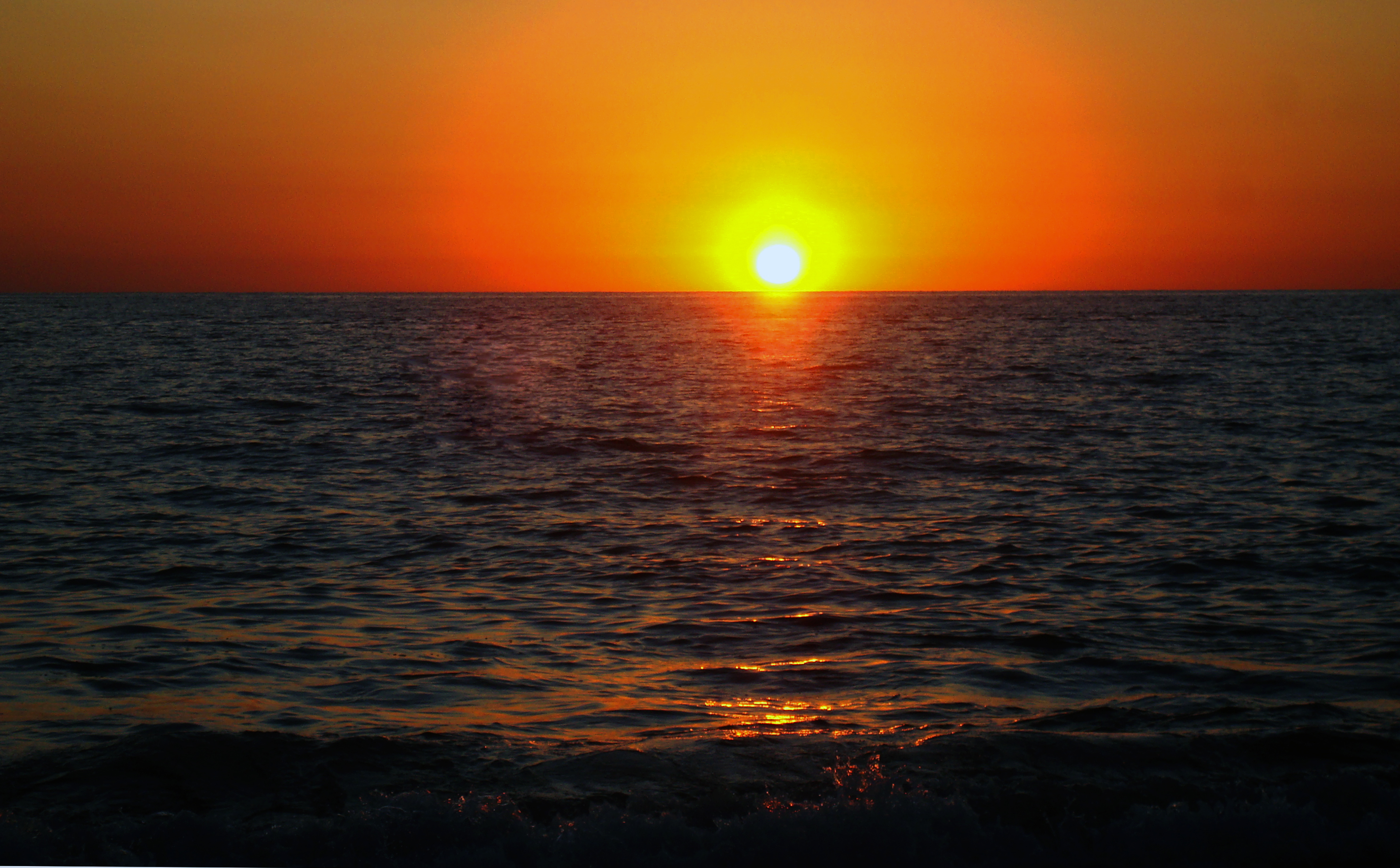
Sunset over Bahía de Banderas

Yelapa is a small beach town in Cabo Corrientes, Jalisco, Mexico. The village lies in the southernmost cove of Bahía de Banderas (Bay of Flags). The town does not have a road big enough for normal vehicles so the only way to arrive is via hourly water ferries from Puerto Vallarta or Boca de Tomatlan.

== Etymology ==
Yelapa's name comes from an indigenous saying meaning "where two rivers meet the sea".

== Climate ==
Yelapa's climate is typical tropical wet and dry (Köppen climate classification Aw), with a marked dry season in the winter. The high temperature and variations in humidity can make July through September nearly intolerable. It has pronounced wet and dry seasonal variation, with sudden monsoon-like rains from July through September, normally for a few hours in the evenings.

The average daily high temperature is 86 °F (30 °C); average daily low temperature is 70 °F (21 °C); average daily humidity is 75%. The rainy season extends from mid-June through mid-October, with most of the rain falling between July and September. August is the city's wettest month, with an average of 14 days with significant precipitation. Even during the rainy season precipitation tends to be concentrated in large rainstorms. Occasional tropical storms will bring thunderstorms to the city in November, though the month is typically dry. February, March and April are the months with the least cloud cover. Prevailing winds are from the southwest, and most weather systems approaching Yelapa and the surrounding areas are consequently weakened as they pass over Cabo Corriente. Thus even during the rainy season Yelapa's weather tends to be mild compared to other areas along the Mexican Pacific coast.

Hurricanes seldom strike Yelapa. In 2002, Hurricane Kenna, a category 5 hurricane, made landfall about 100 miles (160 km) northwest of Puerto Vallarta, and the surrounding cities suffered some damage from the resulting storm surge.

Climate data for Yelapa, Jalisco, Mexico
Month	Jan	Feb	Mar	Apr	May	Jun	Jul	Aug	Sep	Oct	Nov	Dec	Year
Record high °C (°F)	35.0 (95.0)	35.0 (95.0)	36.0 (96.8)	36.0 (96.8)	43.5 (110.3)	45.0 (113.0)	45.0 (113.0)	39.0 (102.2)	38.0 (100.4)	39.0 (102.2)	37.0 (98.6)	36.0 (96.8)	45.0 (113.0)
Mean daily maximum °C (°F)	28.8 (83.8)	29.0 (84.2)	29.2 (84.6)	29.9 (85.8)	31.0 (87.8)	32.3 (90.1)	33.3 (91.9)	33.7 (92.7)	33.6 (92.5)	33.6 (92.5)	32.3 (90.1)	29.9 (85.8)	31.4 (88.5)
Daily mean °C (°F)	22.8 (73.0)	22.7 (72.9)	23.1 (73.6)	23.6 (74.5)	25.6 (78.1)	27.6 (81.7)	28.1 (82.6)	28.4 (83.1)	28.3 (82.9)	27.9 (82.2)	26.0 (78.8)	24.0 (75.2)	25.7 (78.2)
Mean daily minimum °C (°F)	16.7 (62.1)	16.3 (61.3)	16.9 (62.4)	17.2 (63.0)	20.2 (68.4)	22.8 (73.0)	22.9 (73.2)	23.0 (73.4)	22.9 (73.2)	22.2 (72.0)	19.7 (67.5)	18.0 (64.4)	19.9 (67.8)
Record low °C (°F)	11 (52)	8 (46)	12 (54)	11 (52)	11 (52)	17 (63)	21 (70)	21 (70)	18 (64)	16 (61)	13 (55)	7 (45)	7 (45)
Average rainfall mm (inches)	33.8 (1.33)	5.3 (0.21)	2.0 (0.08)	1.5 (0.06)	15.4 (0.61)	187.6 (7.39)	328.1 (12.92)	312.4 (12.30)	370.0 (14.57)	93.8 (3.69)	19.8 (0.78)	22.5 (0.89)	1,392.2 (54.83)
Average rainy days (≥ 0.1 mm)	2.2	0.7	0.6	0.2	1.0	10.8	16.4	15.2	15.6	5.1	1.4	1.9	71.1
Average relative humidity (%)	67	65	65	67	68	69	69	70	70	68	67	68	68
Source 1: World Meteorological Organization.
Source 2: Weatherbase

== See also ==
- Raicilla
- Tourism in Mexico
