= Em (restaurant) =

Mexican restaurant in Mexico City, Mexico

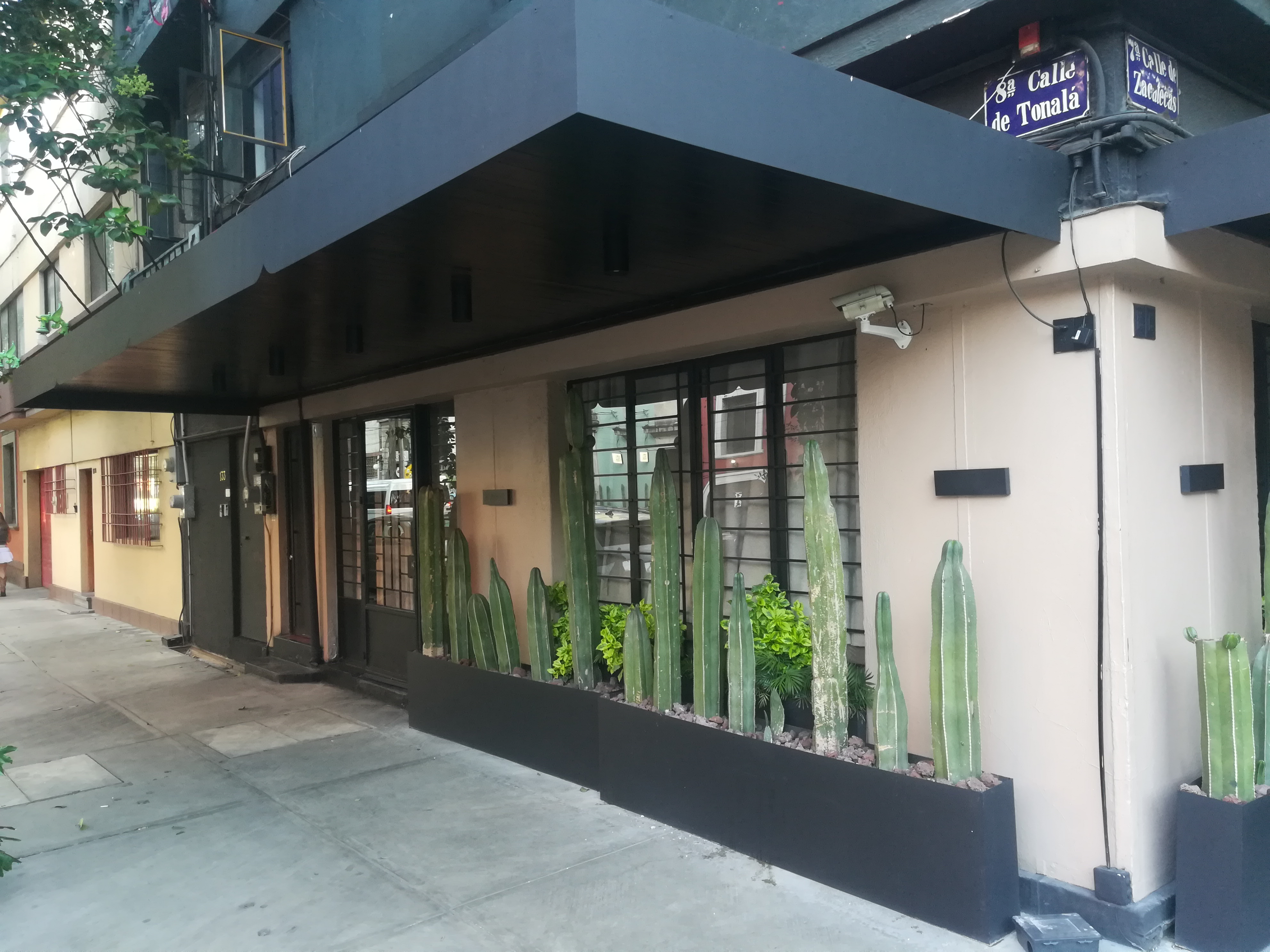
- The restaurant's former location at Tonalá 133 in Colonia Roma Norte in 2026
- Interactive map of Em

Restaurant information
- Established: 2018
- Owner: Luis "Lucho" Martínez
- Head chef: Luis "Lucho" Martínez
- Food type: Mexican; Japanese
- Rating: (Michelin Guide, 2024)
- Location: Avenida Ámsterdam 76, Colonia Hipódromo (Condesa), Cuauhtémoc, Mexico City, 06100, Mexico
- Coordinates: 19°24′50.6″N 99°10′12.1″W
- Reservations: Yes
- Website: itsemilia.rest

Em is a fine dining restaurant in the Condesa area of Mexico City that serves contemporary Mexican cuisine with Japanese influences. It has daily à la carte options and an eight-to nine-full-course tasting menu. It is owned by chef Luis "Lucho" Martínez, who opened it in 2018 as Emília in Mexico City's Colonia Cuauhtémoc district. The business was later renamed and relocated to Colonia Roma due to the impact of the COVID-19 pandemic on the food industry. Critics have given Em favorable reviews, and in 2024, the restaurant received one Michelin star in the first Michelin Guide covering restaurants in Mexico. The restaurant was relocated to Condesa in 2026.

== Description ==
Em serves Mexican food with Japanese influences. It offers both à la carte and an eight-to nine-course omakase tasting menu selections—in which the customer allows the cooks to choose the plates to serve. Its owner, the chef Luis "Lucho" Martínez, states the menu constantly changes because it "keeps the mystery alive" and allows the use of in-season ingredients. The card menu is updated weekly, and daily options alongside it are replaced every three months. Customers who choose the tasting menu are seated in the main bar while those who order à la carte sit at surrounding tables.

According to Regina Barberena, the menu has included options like baby corns topped with caviar and queso bola sourced from Ocosingo, Chiapas; a mushroom enoki dashi risotto, shimeji with caramelized onion and chili garlic; sea bass topped with parsley stem cream and white garlic sauce; lemon balm ice cream; and sea-salt-and-caramel-filled dark chocolate with konbu ice cream on top. On his trip, Guillaume Guevara noted dishes such as mole with beef tongue, spicy chicken, wagyu beef, and Petrossian caviar.

Em is open in the evening and reservations are required.

== History ==
According to Martínez, who previously worked at the restaurants Quintonil, Máximo Bistrot, and Mia Domenicca, he opened his restaurant with the vision of creating a menu based on his own interpretation of Mexico. He also did not want to create a Mexican establishment that could be associated with other fine dining places such as Pujol or Quintonil. He opened Emília in 2018 on Río Pánuco Street, Colonia Cuauhtémoc, and named the restaurant after his daughter. Martínez and his associate Ebo Kobayashi planned the restaurant's interior design with Japanese designer Kanako Ishida, using materials including copper, quarry, and marble.

In her visit to the restaurant in 2019, Mary Holland described the space as "glossy", with marble tables and leather seats. In the background, indie and rock playlists played, giving it the feel of a "cool, underground haunt" rather than an haute cuisine restaurant. To access the restaurant, customers had to climb narrow, candlelit stairs. Inside, the lighting was dim, and at the center stood a square bar.

Due to the impact of the COVID-19 pandemic on the food industry, the restaurant was renamed Em and relocated to Tonalá Street, Colonia Roma, in a space that previously housed Máximo Bistrot. It had space for 52 seats. Above the restaurant, Martínez opened a bar named 686 Bar.

Martínez had mentioned his desire to relocate Em, as it is easier to work in a single-floor kitchen than in a building with multiple stories. Em was relocated in October 2026, to Ámsterdam Street, in Colonia Condesa.

== Reception ==
In her visit to Emília in 2019, Holland of Robb Report recommended choosing à la carte dishes over the tasting menu, as the latter would not provide the full range of flavors. The next year, in a review for Condé Nast Traveler, she advised sitting at the bar to watch the chefs cook the food.

In her review for Time Out, Barberena rated Em with five stars out of five saying that Emília was "profiled in world cuisine with surprising techniques, tasteful finishing touches that are not necessarily bound to delight every palate", showing her appreciation for experiencing a variety of flavors on a plate. On its selection of the top twenty-three restaurants in Mexico City, the same magazine ranked Em at number fifteen in 2024.

Guevara wrote for The Infatuation that the plates are "high-end" and saw Em as a more-approachable restaurant than Pujol. The food review magazine Marco Beteta recommended the omakase options. Juan Carlos Gamboa of Caras said the chef's dishes "surprise with their elegance and simplicity". A reviewer for El Universal found the experience enjoyable and the flavors intense. Zachary Rabinor of Travel + Leisure described the service as meticulous, an opinion shared by Natalia de la Rosa for Chilango.

When the Michelin Guide debuted in 2024 in Mexico, it awarded 18 restaurants with Michelin stars. Em received one star, meaning "high-quality cooking, worth a stop". The guide added: "[b]oth the à la carte and the tasting menus overlap well enough ... Refined, bold flavors come through clearly in both". Martínez appeared in the Apple TV docuseries Knife Edge: Chasing Michelin Stars (2025), where he reflects that the star is a reward rather than a goal.

Em, along with six other Michelin-starred restaurants in Mexico City, was honored by Martí Batres, the head of the Mexico City government. He presented the chefs with an onyx statuette as a token of appreciation for their role in promoting tourism in the city. The statuette's design is inspired by the pre-Hispanic sculpture The Young Woman of Amajac, in recognition of the significant contributions of indigenous women to national and international gastronomy.

== See also ==
- List of Japanese restaurants
- List of Mexican restaurants
- List of Michelin-starred restaurants in Mexico
- List of restaurants in Mexico

== Bibliography ==
- Holland, Mary (June 2019). "Emília, Mexico City". Robb Report. Vol. 43, no. 6. ISSN 0279-1447.
- Holland, Mary (May–June 2020). "Global, But Local". Condé Nast Traveler. Vol. 55, no. 4. ISSN 0893-9683.
- Rabinor, Zachary (September 2025). "Tables to Travel For". Travel + Leisure. Vol. 55, no. 8. ISSN 0041-2007.
