= Casa Lamm =

Coordinates: 19°25′6.8″N 99°9′34.46″W

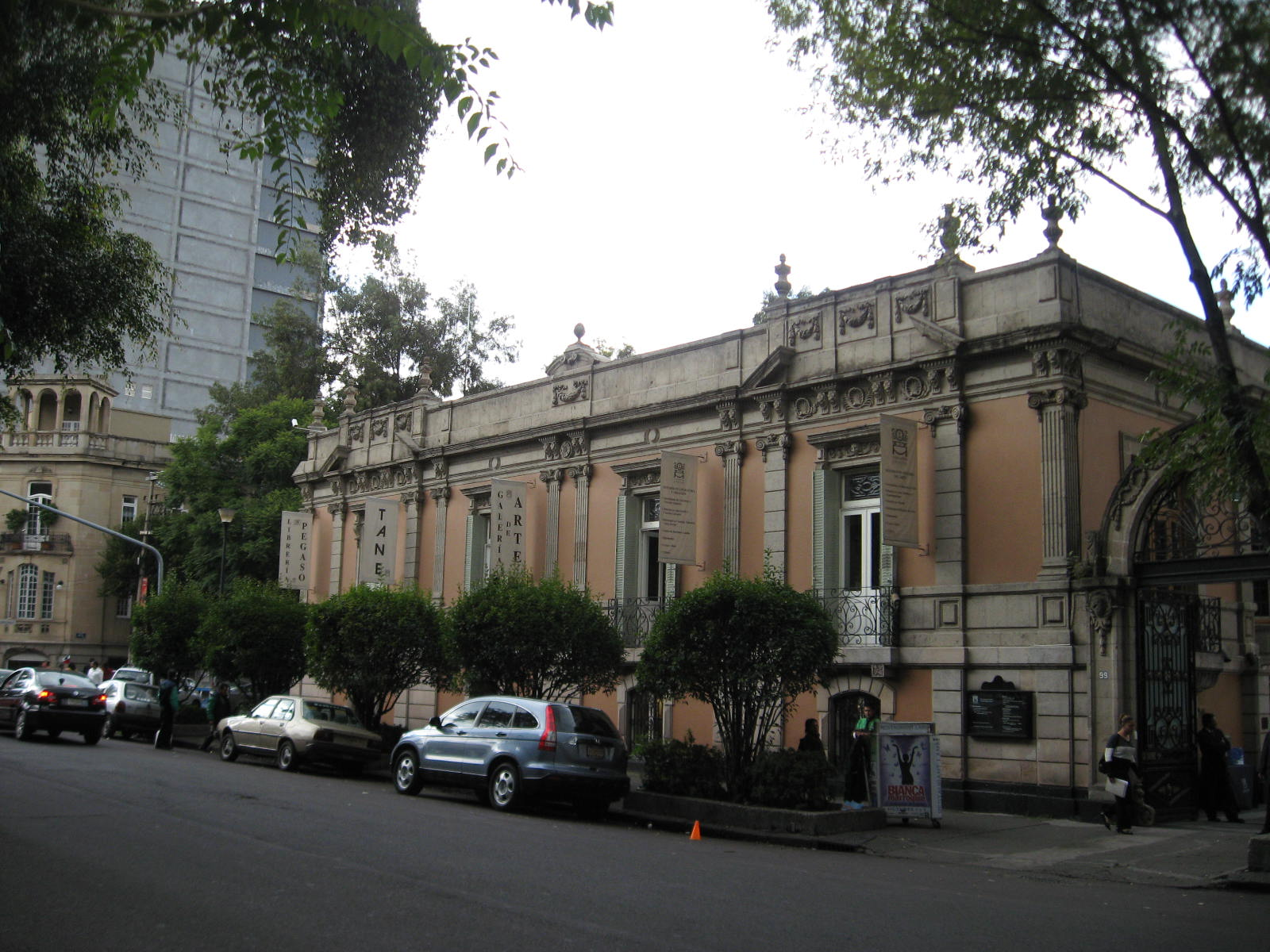
Casa Lamm Cultural Center

The Casa Lamm Cultural Center was built in the early 20th century when Colonia Roma was a new neighborhood for the wealthy leaving the historic center of Mexico City. In the 1990s the house was restored, and since 1994 it hosts exhibits as well as offering classes in art and literature.

== History ==
Casa Lamm was a project to rehabilitate one of the old mansions which was supported by local authorities. The house was originally constructed as part of Colonia Roma, which was a development in the late 19th and early 20th century on a former horse farm owned by Pedro Lascurain. While Lascurain was part of the project initially, Lewis Lamm took over in 1914, building houses for the wealthy moving out of the city center. The house itself was finished in 1911 situated on Alvaro Obregon Street #99 where it still stands. Like others built during this time, the architecture broke with that of the colonial period, heavily influenced by European, especially French, trends of the late 19th and early 20th centuries. It initially was meant to be the residence of Lewis Lamm and his family, but he never lived there. He rented the property to the Marists, it became the Colegio Francés Jalisco, a school for boys. During the Cristero War, Lamm asked for the return of his property. He received it but in poor condition. Upon Lamm's death in 1939, his widow sold the property to the García Collantes family who kept it until 1990, keeping the house from being demolished like many of the Colonia in the latter 20th century for redevelopment.

In 1993, restoration work on the house began although much of the house's original elements were lost due to time and neglect. When restoration work was finished, it became the Casa Lamm Cultural Center in 1994. When the Center opened there was no bookstore, or galleries and the workshops will still in progress. Beatriz Espejo inaugurated the space dedicated to literature, which as hosted names such as Guillermo Arreola, Álvaro Mutis and Octavio Paz . It was part of a larger project to make Colonia Roma a center for the visual arts in Mexico and attract more galleries, artists and others to set up shop here. The ongoing project has had mixed success. It has attracted the participation of entities such as the Salón de la Plástica Mexicana, the Universidad de la Comunicación, Jomart, the Universidad Interamericana de México and the Casa de Francia, and various galleries have has full and profitable shows. However, security problems and lack of maintenance of public areas in the colonia by the city government have sometimes made it difficult to attract or keep artists and institutions.

== Facilities ==
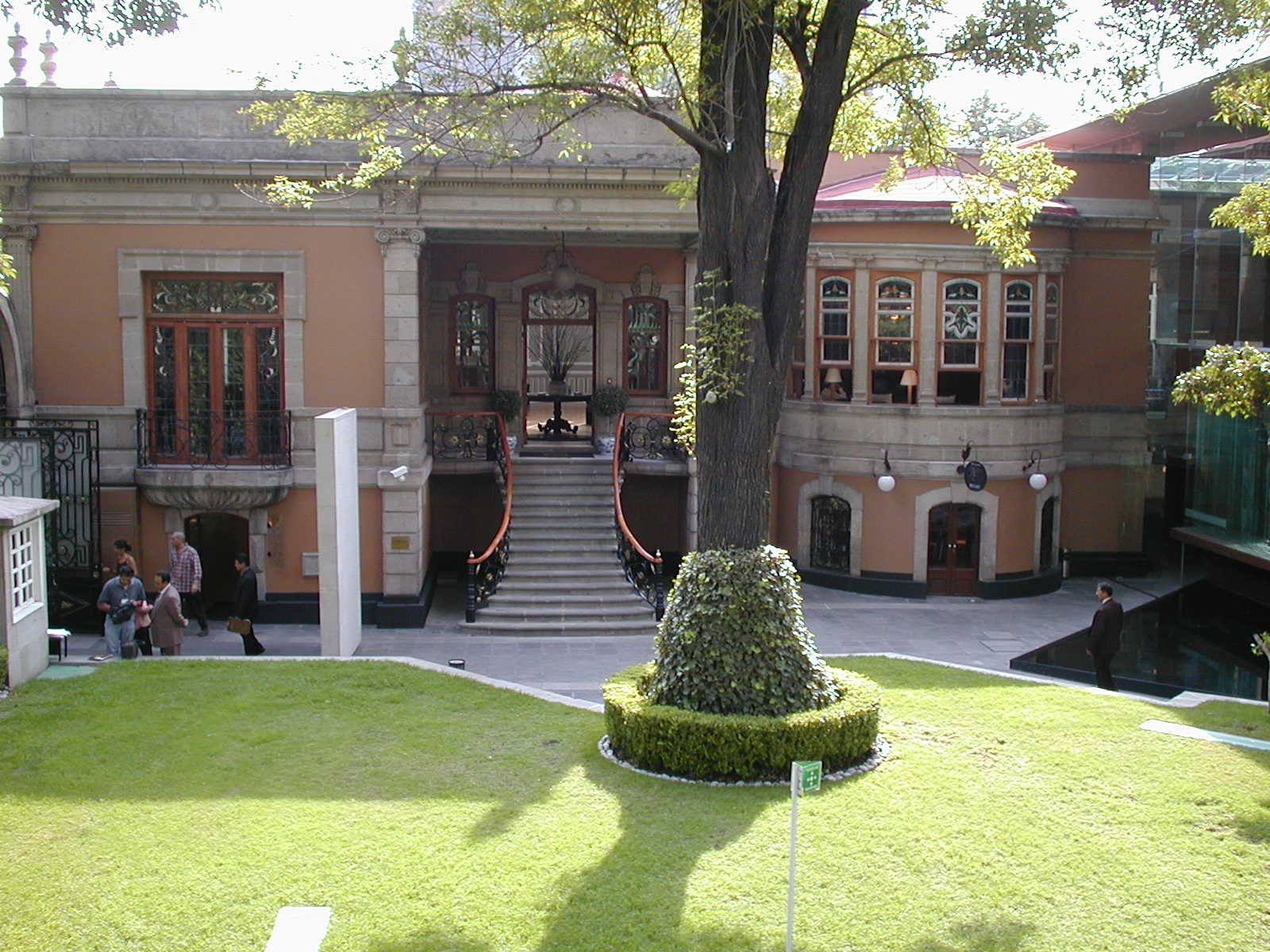
Courtyard inside Casa Lamm

The institute consists of art exhibition space and management, some graduate level programs in the fine arts and a restaurant and bookstore, which are open to the public. Since it opened, it has hosted numerous art exhibitions. The art exhibitions are held in the various galleries that are in the building. There is a committee which chooses the artists to exhibit which includes known names as well as new talents. In 2010, the Center held over fifteen exhibitions related to painting, photography and other disciplines, including those by Jacinto de Marín, and Francisco Toledo.

In 1999, it received custody of Televisa's large art collection, which was formerly housed in the Centro de Arte Contemporaneo in Polanco. The main challenge in accepting the collection was to build adequate facilities for its preservation. One of the downstairs galleries was converted for the purpose. The space contains four areas: the vault (which is fifty cm off the floor to control humidity), a research and consultation room for experts, one for the general public and a space for exhibitions of pieces selected on a rotating basis. The walls of the vault are isolated from those of the room which contains controls for temperature and humidity. The collection contains 2,294 images that Manuel Álvarez Bravo collected over twenty years. It contains works by pioneers such as Charles Gerard, William Henry Fox Talbot, Henri Cartier-Bresson, Kati Horna, Karl Blossfeldt, Man Ray, Guillermo Kahlo, Edward Weston, Tina Modotti, Graciela Iturbide, Pablo Ortiz Monasterio and Rafael Doniz as well as by Alvarez Bravo himself. The entire collection has also been digitalized.

On the ground floor of the building, facing the street are the bookstore and restaurant. The Liberia Pegaso bookstore contains large selections in English and Spanish, especially in art-related books, but there are also books on literature, history and poetry. The Las Flores del Mal restaurant was last remodeled in 2003, and is considered to be a very fashionable place to eat. Most of the dining area is centered on an open-air patio accented by a black fountain. Many of the restaurant's patrons are those dedicated to the arts and media. It can also be rented for special events. It has a wide variety wines from various countries but the menu is not extensive containing international cuisine with Mexican touches such as huitlacoche, epazote and tamarind.

The center offers bachelor's in art history, as well as masters in art, art appreciation and literary creation and a doctorate in art history. The bachelor's is offered in conjunction with Secretariat of Public Education. It also offers courses, certificate programs, seminars and workshops in various disciplines such as art history, Mexican history, archeology, painting, sculpture, philosophy, music and cinema. It also contains an art library with almost 12,000 volumes, just over 680 videos.
