= Campillo =

Campillo may refer to:

== Places in Spain ==
- Campillo de Altobuey, a municipality in Cuenca, Castile-La Mancha
- Campillo de Aragón, a municipality located in the province of Zaragoza, Aragon
- Campillo de Aranda, a municipality located in the province of Burgos, Castile and León
- Campillo de Arenas, a city located in the province of Jaén
- Campillo de Azaba, a village and municipality in the province of Salamanca, Castile-León
- Campillo de Deleitosa, a municipality located in the province of Cáceres, Extremadura
- Campillo de Dueñas, a municipality located in the province of Guadalajara, Castile-La Mancha
- Campillo de Llerena, a municipality located in the province of Badajoz, Extremadura
- Campillo de Ranas, a municipality located in the province of Guadalajara, Castile-La Mancha

== Other ==
- Campillo (surname)
- El Campillo (disambiguation), the name of several places
- Campillos, a town and municipality in the province of Málaga, part of the autonomous community of Andalusia in southern Spain
