= Monasterio (surname) =

Monasterio is a Spanish surname. Notable people with the surname include:

- Andruw Monasterio (born 1997), Venezuelan professional baseball infielder
- Ángel Ortiz Monasterio (1849–1922), Mexican vice-admiral
- Agueda Monasterio de Lattapiat (1776–1817), one of the national heroines of the Chilean War of Independence
- Clara Fuentes Monasterio (born 1997), Venezuelan Paralympic powerlifter
- César Monasterio, several people
- David Monasterio (born 1971), Puerto Rican former international freestyle and butterfly swimmer
- Derrick Monasterio (born 1995), Filipino actor, singer, host, and model
- Jakson Vicent Monasterio (born 1991), Venezuelan rower
- Jesús de Monasterio (1836–1903), Spanish violinist, composer, conductor, and teacher
- Joaquín Monasterio (born 1984), Bolivian football manager
- Luis Ortiz Monasterio (1906–1990), Mexican sculptor
- María Teresa Monasterio (born 1969), Bolivian weightlifter
- Pablo Ortiz Monasterio, Mexican photographer, writer, and editor
- Ricardo Monasterio (born 1978), Venezuelan former competition swimmer
- Rocío Monasterio (born 1974), Spanish-Cuban architect, businesswoman, and politician

== See also ==
- Monasterios
