= Monumento a la Madre =

Monumento a la Madre may refer to:

- Monumento a la Madre, Guadalajara, Jalisco, Mexico
- Monumento a la Madre, Mexico City, Mexico
