= Ortiz Monasterio =

Ortiz Monasterio (pronounced [oɾˈtis monasˈteɾjo]) is a composite Spanish-language surname, comprising the names Ortiz and Monasterio.

People with the surname include:

- Ángel Ortiz Monasterio (Ortiz Monasterio Irizarri, 1849–1922), Mexican naval officer and politician
- Fernando Ortiz Monasterio (Ortiz Monasterio y de Garay, 1923–2012), Mexican plastic surgeon
- Jaime Ortiz Monasterio (Ortiz Monasterio y de Garay, 1928–2001), Mexican architect, worked with Abraham Zabludovsky
- Luis Ortiz Monasterio (Ortiz Monasterio del Campillo, 1906–1990), Mexican sculptor
- Pablo Ortiz Monasterio (Ortiz Monasterio Prieto, born 1952), Mexican photographer

== See also ==
- es:Categoría:Familia Ortiz Monasterio
