= Jardín del Arte Sullivan =

Market in Mexico City, Mexico

Coordinates: 19°25′57.51″N 99°9′39.71″W

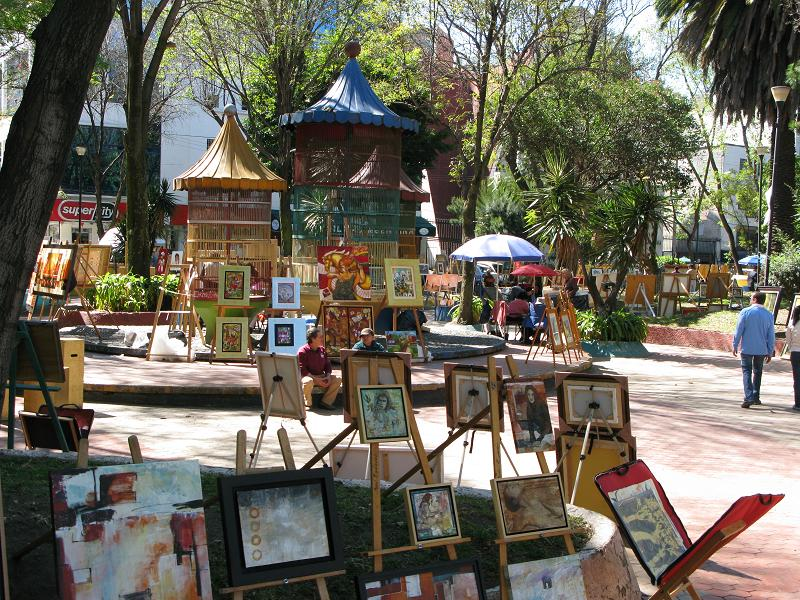
Scene at the Jardín del Arte Sullivan

The Jardín del Arte Sullivan (literally Sullivan Garden of Art) is an outdoor art market that takes place every Sunday near the historic center of Mexico City in a neighborhood called Colonia San Rafael. This gallery began in the 1950s, when young artists who could not show their works in traditional galleries and shows decided to set up in front of their studios and in local parks to exhibit and sell their work. A number began to do so at the base of the Monumento a la Madre ("Monument to Mothers") at Sullivan Park and in 1959, the Asociación Jardín del Arte, a non profit civil association was established affiliated with the Instituto Nacional de la Juventud Mexicana. Since then the outdoor gallery has shown works by a number of artists who moved on to better things such as Rodolfo Morales, established a second and third art market in the San Ángel neighborhood and has grown to 700 members.

== Description ==
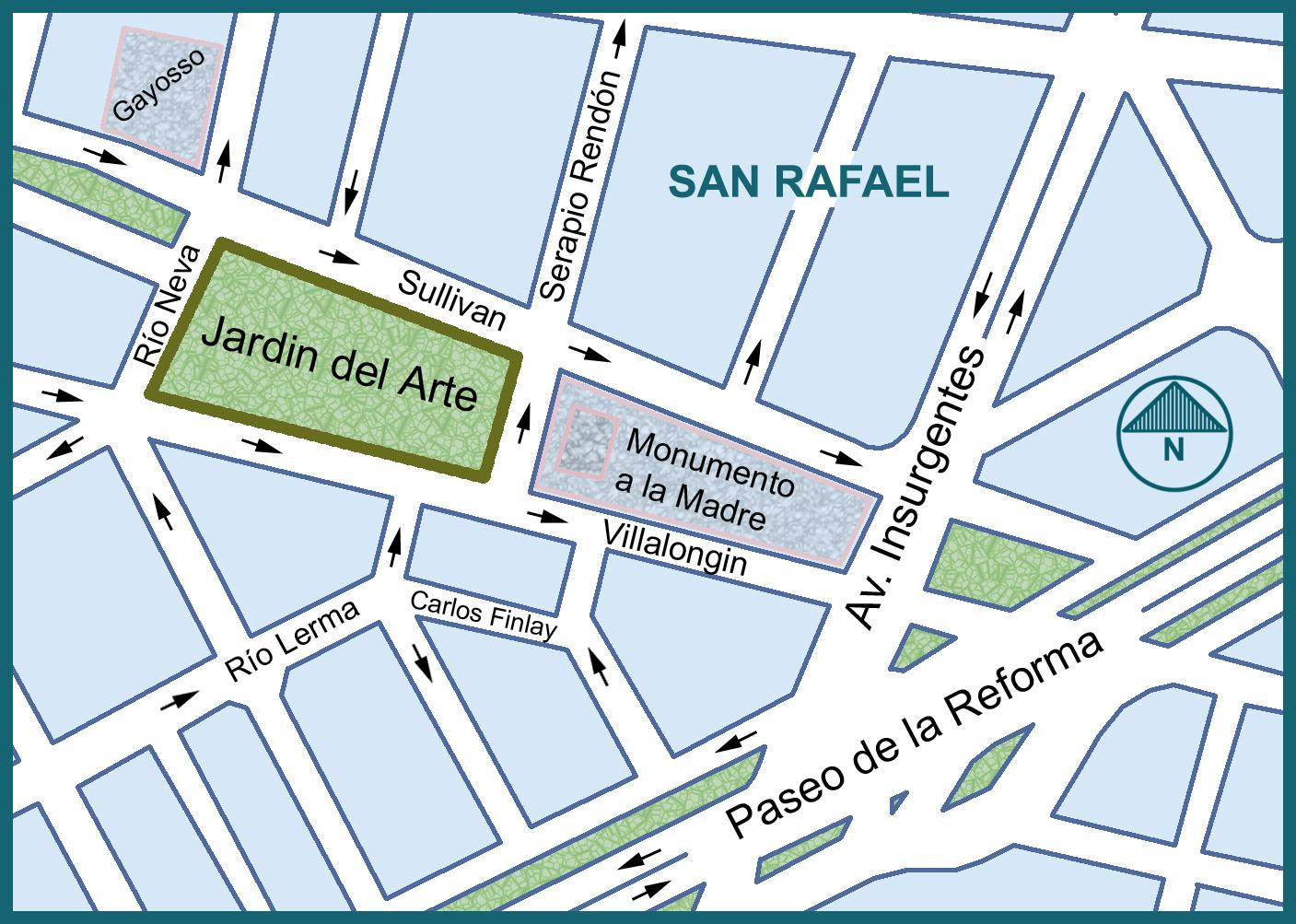
Locater map of the market site

The “Jardín del Arte Sullivan” is an outdoor art gallery which takes place every Sunday at Sullivan Park, behind the Monumento a la Madre (Monument to Mothers) in Colonia San Rafael. Each week, between 350 and 400 artists display and sell their works.

Works displayed include paintings, sculptures, etchings and photography. The sizes of the works range from miniatures of five or ten cm to very large paintings measuring meters in height and width. There are a wide variety of techniques, styles and media presented at the Jardín. Paintings include inks, oils, watercolors, pastels on canvas, acrylic and paper. Paintings include those of children, landscapes, abstracts and nudes. Prices range from three hundred pesos to 50,000, depending on the format and the artist.

This outdoor art gallery was established in 1955 in order to give young and unknown artists a chance to show and sell their work. This is still the case today. One of the latter is Jorge Espinosa Carrizales, who has been selling here for over forty years. A number of artists give classes in the market itself in painting, sculpture and even violin, which were given by Espinoza Carrizales at the Serapio Rendón corner of the park. Other longtime artists include Roberto Ulises, Marco Antonio Zepeda, Reynaldo Torres and Armando Anguiano. A number of artists from here have been recruited by national and international galleries and other venues, including the Sistema Nacional de Creadores de Arte .

The Garden of Art is held in Sullivan Park in Colonia San Rafael, surrounded by Villalongín, Río Neva, Sullivan and Serapio Rendón streets, behind the Monumento a la Madre. This is an 18,525 acre park which was enlarged in the late 1990s, when a former parking lot was moved underground and the above ground space integrated with the park already here. The outdoor gallery here is set up and taken down on Sunday, during the rest of the week, the park has its normal function.

The Sunday art gallery is managed and sponsored by the Asociación Jardín del Arte, a non profit civil association. This organization, founded in 1955, has about 700 members and sponsors two other similar outdoors galleries in San Ángel, in the southwest of the city. Members participating artists and the organization sets a number of rules as to who may exhibit and how. Early in its history, artists could display whatever works they wanted for however long. Today, a commission now selects what can be displayed with limits on the number of works of the same technique and the level of quality required. One rule prohibits the sale of copies of other works. All works must be originals. Artworks with political and religious themes are also prohibited. Guest artists, not members of the association, are also permitted to sell for a period of up to three months at a time. Some of the members of the association include Víctor Manuel Barragán, Daniel Bejarano Pichardo, Jorge Espinosa Carrizales, Lilian Gutiérrez, Antonio Huizar Reyes, Alma Juárez Ilizaliturri, Víctor Peralta, Maricarmen Villasana and Guadalupe Motilla.

== History ==
In Mexico City, the word “jardín” or garden can be applied to a variety of spaces, from playgrounds to spaces devoted to plants. However, often when “jardín” is part of the place name, it indicates public space, and one most frequented on Sundays for leisure or ritual purposes. This dates back to the custom of visiting parks, plazas and gardens after Mass.

The origin of the outdoor gallery begins on nearby Justo Sierra Street, in an area where many university students lived in the 1950s, including young artists. A number of these artists such as Antonio Albanes, Armando Anguiano, Napoleon Panama, Efrain Reyes, Oswaldo Partida, Rafael Arles, Georgina Isita, and Jorge Contreras formed an association called “Grupo 23 Escalones” (23 Stairs Group) to share and critique each other's work. It was at one of these sessions that Jorge Contreras proposed the idea of selling artworks on the steps of their studios and into the local parks on Sundays when people were out wandering the streets and parks. The reason behind this was that it was very difficult for young and unknown talent to get their work shown at conventional galleries and shows.

In 1955, a number of young artists began to show their works at the base of the Monumento a la Madre (Monument to Mothers) at Sullivan Park, including Armando Anguiano, Fernando Cruz Espana, Oswaldo Partida, Roberto Kan and Jorge Contreras. The association was founded four years later in 1959, by David Marín Foucher and Jorge Contreras. One year later, the association became affiliated with the Instituto Nacional de la Juventud Mexicana.

A number who sell works here as amateurs go on to bigger things such as Rodolfo Morales, Leonardo Nierman and Luis Pérez Flores (former director of the Academy of San Carlos) and Víctor Ríos Valencia, winner of the first Premio Nacional de Pintura (National Painting Prize) organized by the association in 1956. More recent talents include Ernesto Alcántaro, who presented at the Galería de la Plástica Mexicana and Froylán Ojeda, who has had exhibitions in Mexico and abroad. Other notable names include Austreberto Morales and Edgardo Coghlan. Famous buyers at the market have included Emilio Azcárraga Milmo and former president Adolfo Ruiz Cortines .

The Sullivan Art Garden is a point of reference for local and foreign visitors, since it is located on the tourist corridor of Av. Paseo de la Reforma, a vibrant area with amazing architecture, where you can find both skyscrapers, old mansions, businesses, cafes and restaurants. Nearby is the monument and museum of the Revolution; The Mother Monument is located next to the Garden. Very close, on Av. Paseo de la Reforma, in one of its beautiful gazebos is the column of independence, crowned by a winged victory, better known as the Angel of Independence, made by the architect Rivas Mercado in 1910, to commemorate the 100 years of the independence of Mexico. A space full of tradition, art and culture. There is no better place on Sundays to go for a walk and enjoy art, have an ice cream or a cotton candy and be able to talk directly with the artists

The success of the Jardín del Arte Sullivan prompted the association to establish a second in the San Ángel neighborhood in the southwest of the city in the early 1970s. This gallery grew until it had to be split into two, one in front of the Bazar del Sábado in the Jardín de San Jacinto and another one in the Jardín de El Carmen.

There are other similar outdoor galleries in other cities, such as Querétaro, but they are not affiliated with the Mexico City organization.
