= Monumento a la Madre, Mexico City =

Monument in Mexico City, Mexico

Monument to the Mother
- Monumento a la Madre
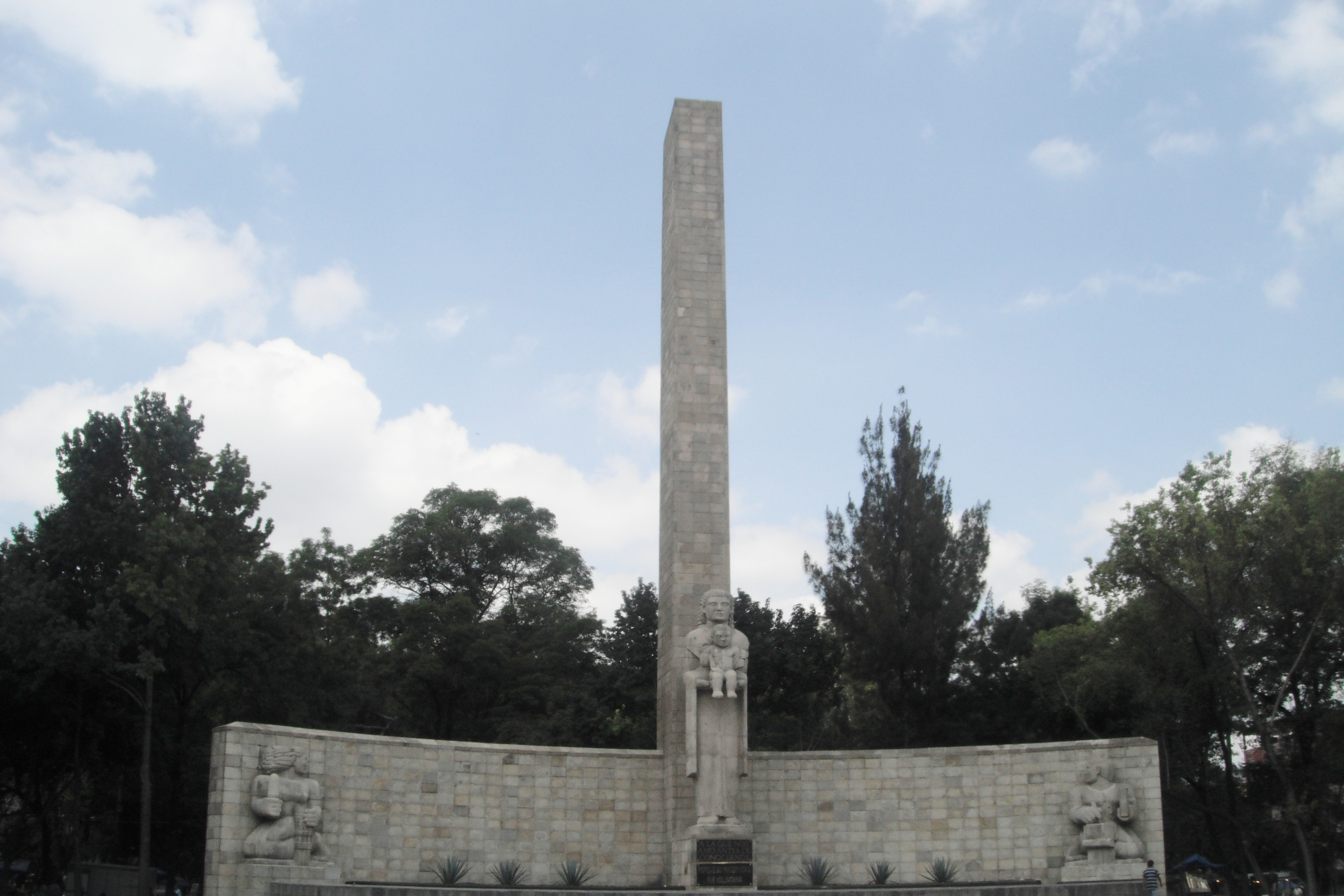
- The monument in 2012
- Interactive map of Monument to the Mother
- Location: Mexico City, Mexico
- Coordinates: 19°25′57.17″N 99°9′38.83″W
- Opening date: May 10, 1949
- Dedicated date: Mother's Day
- Restored date: November 21, 2018
- Dedicated to: Mothers

The Monumento a la Madre (lit. 'Monument to the Mother', also known as the Mother's Monument) is a monument commemorating Mexican mothers, installed in Mexico City, inaugurated on May 10, 1949. It was destroyed on September 19, 2017, after an earthquake of magnitude 7.1 on the Richter scale that shook Mexico City, and reopened on November 21, 2018.

== Description and history ==
In Mexico, the idea of paying tribute to mothers with a monument arose in 1922, when the Secretary of Public Education, José Vasconcelos, and the journalist Rafael Alducín, founder of the newspaper Excélsior, wanted to pay "a tribute of love and tenderness", on May 10. In 1944, President Manuel Ávila Camacho laid the first stone of what would be the Monument to the Mother. The monument was inaugurated by President Miguel Alemán Valdés on May 10, 1949.

The architectural component was completed by José Villagrán García, while the sculptures were designed by Luis Ortiz Monasterio, who won a contest held by Excélsior in 1948. The monument is located in the Jardín del Arte Sullivan, between the streets of Sullivan, Villalongín, and Avenida de los Insurgentes, dividing the Cuauhtémoc and San Rafael colonias (in the Cuauhtémoc borough). It features three sculptures: an indigenous man seen writing, an indigenous woman with an ear of corn (a symbol of fertility), and a mother with a child in her arms.

On September 19, 2017, the monument's central sculpture collapsed due to a 7.1-magnitude earthquake that shook Mexico City. On November 21, 2018, the government of Mexico City reopened the monument. The project was carried out by the architect Gabriel Mérigo.

== See also ==
- Monumento a la Madre, Guadalajara
