= César Monasterio =

César Monasterio may refer to:

- César Monasterio (golfer) (born 1963), Argentine golfer
- César Monasterio (footballer) (born 1971), Argentine football manager and former player
