= Monasterios =

Monasterios is a Spanish surname. Notable people with the surname include:

- Carlos Monasterios (born 1986), Venezuelan baseball player
- Rubén Monasterios (1938–2024), Venezuelan writer and theatre critic
- Silvano Monasterios (born 1964), Venezuelan musician

== See also ==
- Monasterio
