= Fernando Ortiz Monasterio =

Mexican sailor (1923–2012)

- Born: 23 July 1923; Federal District, Mexico
- Died: 31 October 2012 (aged 89); Federal District, Mexico
- Occupations: Plastic surgeon, amateur sailor

Fernando Enrique Ortiz Monasterio y de Garay (Note: In this Mexican name, the surname is Ortiz Monasterio and the second or maternal family name is de Garay.) (23 July 1923 – 31 October 2012) was a Mexican plastic surgeon. He performed the world's first in utero repair of a cleft palate and was considered the father of plastic surgery in Mexico.

== Professional career ==
Fernando Ortiz Monasterio was born in Mexico City in 1923. He graduated in 1945 from the Faculty of Medicine at the National Autonomous University of Mexico (UNAM), where he later taught. He also did postgraduate work in the United States at the University of Texas, Northwest University and Washington University.

He was the head of the Plastic and Reconstructive Surgery Service at the General Hospital of Mexico in 1957–1977 and director-general of the Manuel Gea González General Hospital in 1977–1984. He was admitted to the National Academy of Medicine in 1960 and was elected as its president in 1974.

He performed the world's first in utero repair of a cleft palate and was the first surgeon in Latin America to perform craniofacial surgery. His achievements earned him recognition as the father of plastic surgery in Mexico, and his work in Mexico's public health sector was the subject of the 2012 documentary film Beautiful Faces.

== Personal life ==
Ortiz Monasterio was married to Leonor Prieto Menocal. They had eight children, including the photographer Pablo Ortiz Monasterio, with whom he wrote the book Dolor y belleza about the Renaissance surgeon Gaspare Tagliacozzi.

As an amateur sailor, he competed in the Finn event at the 1964 Summer Olympics in Tokyo.

Fernando Ortiz Monasterio died in Mexico City on 31 October 2012, aged 89.
