= El Campillo =

El Campillo may refer to:

- El Campillo, Huelva, a municipality in the province of Huelva, in the autonomous community of Andalusia, Spain
- El Campillo, Valladolid, a municipality in the province of Valladolid, in the autonomous community of Castile and León, Spain
- El Campillo de la Jara, a municipality in the province of Toledo, in the autonomous community of Castilla-La Mancha, Spain
- El Campillo, Zamora, a village in the municipality of San Pedro de la Nave-Almendra, in the province of Zamora, in the autonomous community of Castile and León, Spain
