= Luis Ortiz Monasterio =

Mexican sculptor

- Born: August 23, 1906; Mexico City
- Died: February 16, 1990 (aged 83); Mexico City
- Education: Academia de San Carlos
- Known for: sculpture

Luis Ortiz Monasterio (August 23, 1906 – February 16, 1990) was a Mexican sculptor noted for his monumental works such as the Monumento a la Madre and the Nezahualcoyotl Fountain in Chapultepec Park. His work was recognized in 1967 with the Premio Nacional de Artes and was a founding member of the Academia de Artes.

== Life ==
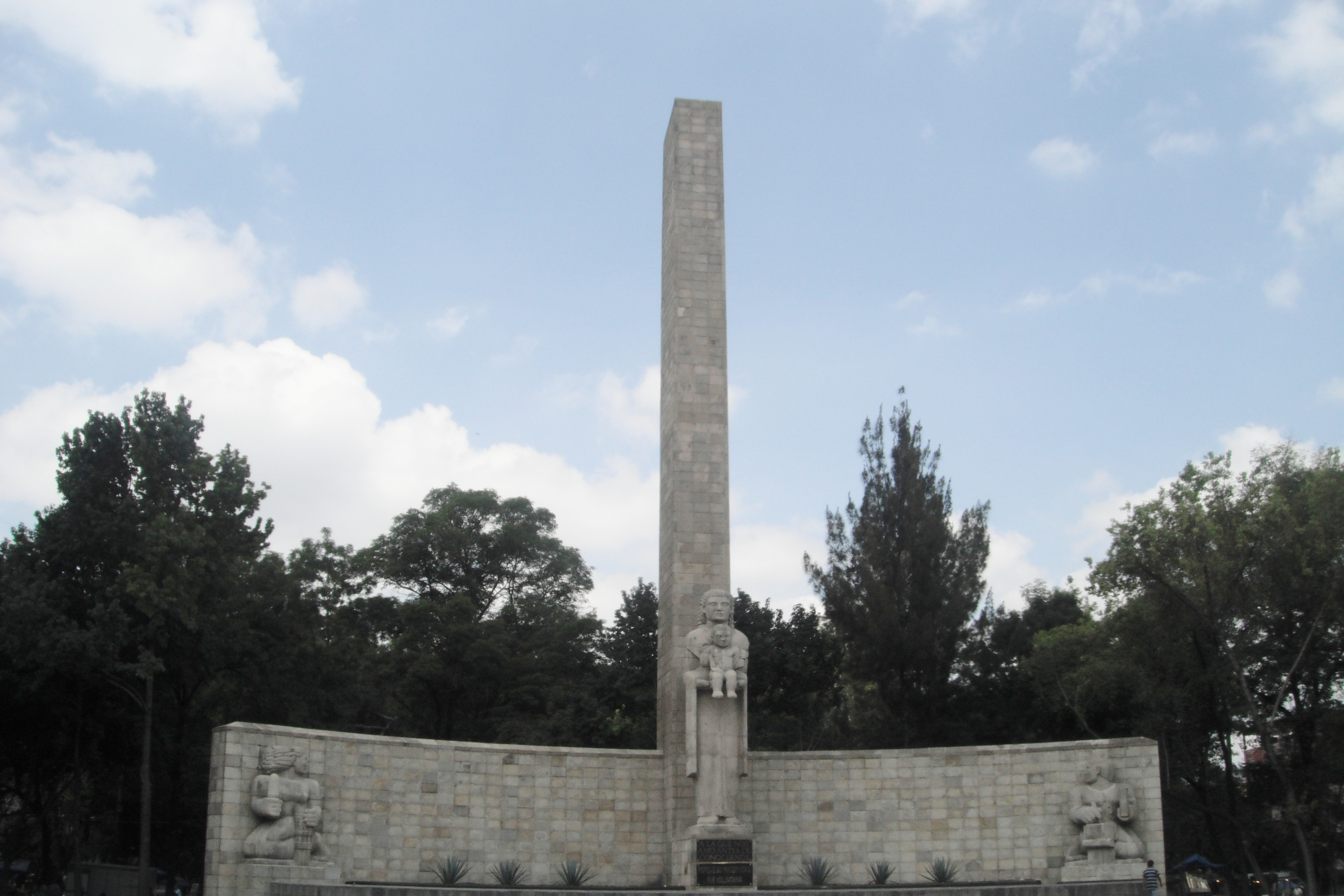
Monumento a la Madre (Monumento to Mothers) in Sullivan Park, Mexico City

Luis Ortiz Monasterio del Campillo (Note: In this Mexican name, the surname is Ortiz Monasterio and the second or maternal family name is del Campillo.) was born in Mexico City, losing his father the year he was born.

In 1920, he spent a year at a teacher's training course at the Escuela Normal para Maestros while studying drawing at night at the Academy of San Carlos. He later registered as a matriculated student, specializing in engraving, drawing and sculpture.

Because of the family's economic situation, he went to Los Angeles, where he worked and studied, coming into contact with the works of Auguste Rodin, Brâncuși and Wilhelm Lehmbruck. In 1927, he participated in a workshop at the Escuela Libre de Escultura y Talla Directa founded by Guillermo Ruiz at the San Ildefonso College, which promoted sculpting Mexican themes and values into native rock.

For the next several years, he lived in the United States and Mexico, before permanently settling in Mexico City. In addition to art, he was an author of books and monographs, which generally contained philosophic and poetic references.

Ortiz Monasterio retired from his sculpting career in 1989, and died a year later at the age of 83 in Mexico City from multiple natural causes. His body was cremated at the Panteón de Dolores in Mexico City.

== Career ==
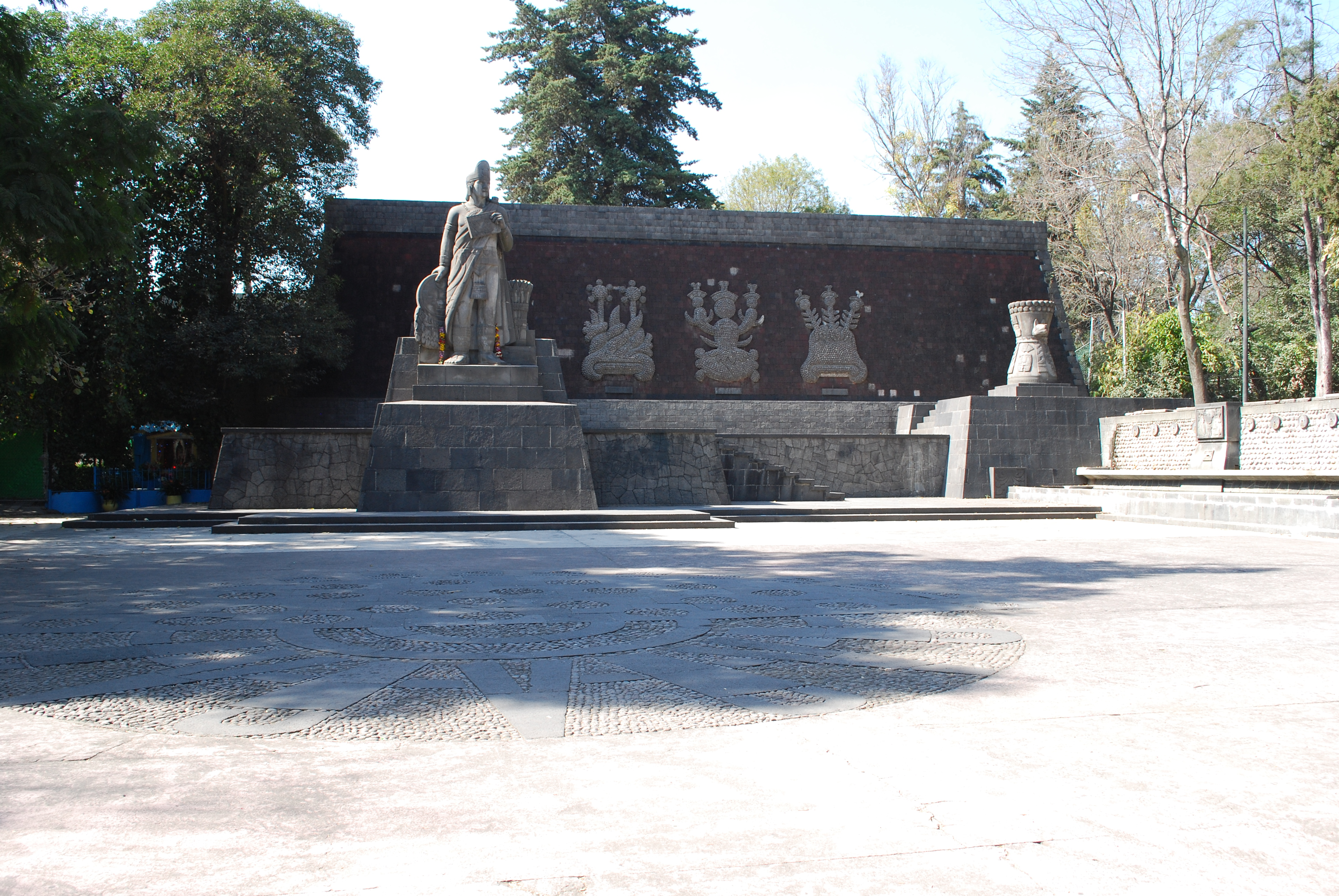
Nezahualcoyotl Fountain in Chapultepec Park

With a career that spanned over sixty years, Ortiz Monasterio is one of the main figures of Mexican sculpture in the 20th century. He is one of few to be active during the dominance of the Mexican muralism movement and one of fewer of the century to be remembered.

The artist began his career in 1927 as a drawing teacher at the Escuela de Maestros Contructores of the Secretaría de Educación Pública, after he returned from studies in the United States. He went on to be a long-time teacher of the Escuela Nacional de Artes Plásticas ENAP from 1939 to 1962 and taught at La Esmeralda as well.

In 1928, Ortiz Monasterio returned to Los Angeles to sculpt full-time, having his first individual exhibition at the Book Shop Gallery and a later one at Gump's Art Gallery in San Francisco. In the 1930s he created a number of sculptures which made him known for their originality of form and texture: El soldado herido (1932), La Victoria (1935), El nacimiento de Apolo (1936) and La Venus (1937) . He had two shows at the Galería de Arte Mexicano at UNAM in 1935 and 1936. In 1946 he participated in the International Sculpture Exhibition at the Philadelphia Museum of Art, which acquired a work called Cabeza de mujer (1945). Another piece was acquired by the Museum of Modern Art in New York.

His success in United States brought him back to Mexico, where he received commissions for monumental works. The first of these was El llamado de al revolución in stone, carved between 1932 and 1934. The next in a similar technique, was El esclavo, which has since been lost. Later works include the reliefs for the Benemérita Escuela Nacional de Maestros, the Monumento a los defensores de la ciudad de Puebla (1943), the Monumento a la Madre in Parque Sullivan (1948) the Nezahualcoyotl Fountain in Chapultepec Park, the pórtico for the open air theater of the Plaza Cívica of the Unidad Independencia housing complex and the Tigres y Águilas sculpture at the IMSS's Centro Médico Nacional (1963). He also created sculptures for cities such as Xalapa and Acapulco.

The first award for his work was a prize in sculpture from the Secretaría de Educación Pública in 1946. In 1967 he received the Premio Nacional de Artes in sculpture. In 1968 he was a founding member of the Academia de Artes and later received a diploma and medal for his teaching career at ENAP. Posthumous tributes include one in 1992 at the OMR Gallery, an exhibition in 1992 at Louis Stern Galleries; and a retrospective in 2011 at the Museo Casa Estudio Diego Rivera y Frida Kahlo.

However, since his career, about fifteen percent of his work is missing or destroyed and much of the rest is in deteriorated condition, especially the monumental works.

== Artistry ==
Ortiz Monasterio is of the generation of Mexican sculptors which includes Oliverio Martínez, Francisco Marín, Juan Cruz Reyes, Federico Cantú, Federico Canessi and Carlos Bracho, which adopted elements of Art Deco and Cubism, using figures from the working class and indigenous populations. His artistic style is characterized by the use of classical and geometric elements, along with pre-Hispanic influence. There is also influence from an artist named Ivan Mestrock, a Yugoslav artist whose works he saw in art magazines from Europe. In his works, he applied concepts from numerology and Pythagorism along with metaphysical concepts from the Aztec and Mayan cultures.

His work can be divided into two types. The first are monumental public works with historical themes, such as the Nezahualcoyotl Fountain in Chapultepec (1956) and the Plaza Cívica de la Unidad Independencia (1962). His smaller works often consists of sensual human forms as well as those with a mechanical feel.
