= El Campillo, Valladolid =

Village in Valladolid, Castile-Leon, Spain

Coordinates: 41°15′29″N 5°00′54″W

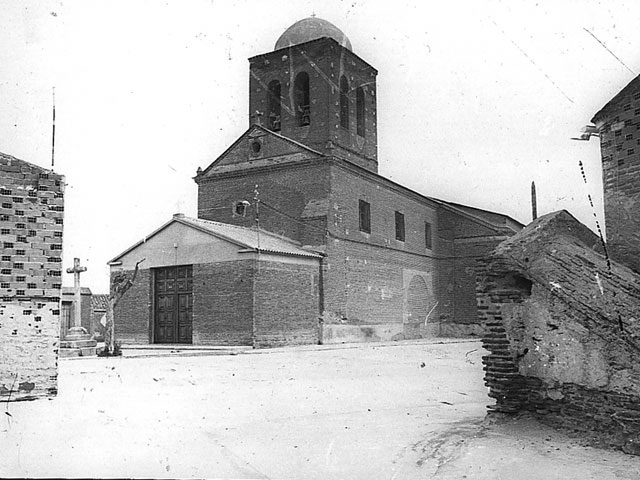

Coat of arms of El Campillo, Valladolid

El Campillo is a village in Valladolid, Castile-Leon, Spain. The municipality covers an area of 32.84 square kilometres (12.68 sq mi) and as of 2011 had a population of 231 people.
