= Austreberto Morales =

Austreberto Morales Ramirez (born August 24, 1932) is a Mexican artist.

Austreberto was born in Cuitzeo, Michoacán. He started studying art in Mexico City at the Academia de San Carlos. In 1960 he held his first solo-show and later exhibited widely in cities such as Tijuana, Acapulco, Querétaro, Guadalajara and Monterrey in Mexico. His work has also been the subject of numerous international exhibitions in San Diego CA, Hollywood CA, San Francisco CA, Beverly Hills CA, Seville and Madrid in Spain.
