= Colonia San Rafael =

Coordinates: 19°26′19.07″N 99°9′45.66″W

San Rafael
- Neighborhood of Mexico City
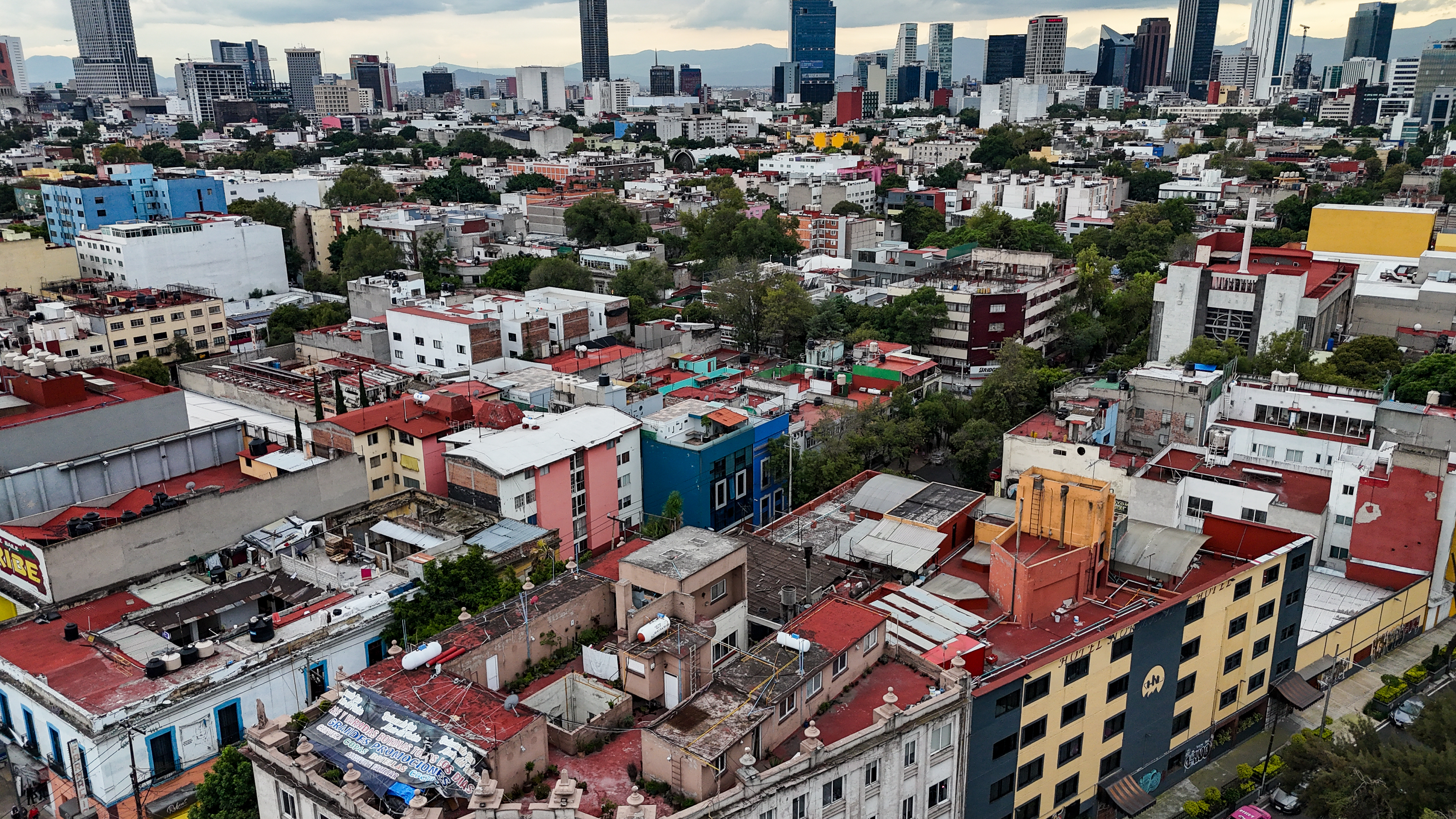

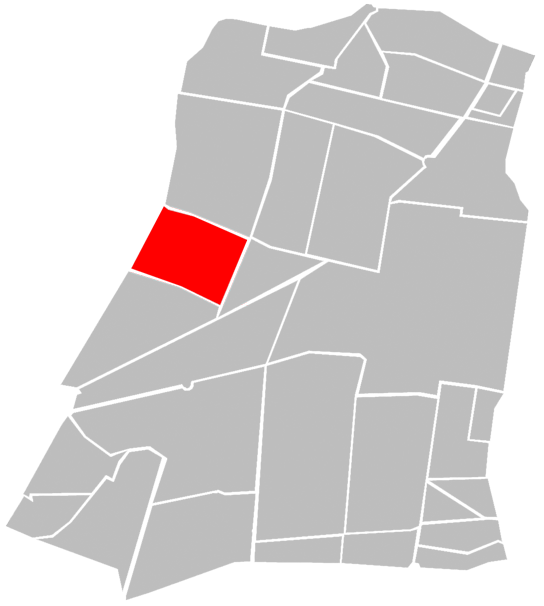
- Location of Colonia San Rafael (in red) within Cuauhtémoc borough
- Country: Mexico
- City: Mexico City
- Borough: Cuauhtémoc

Population (2010)
  - Total: 19,684
- Postal code: 06470

Colonia San Rafael is a colonia of the Cuauhtémoc borough of Mexico City, just west of the historic city center. It was established in the late 19th century as one of the first formal neighborhoods outside of the city center and initially catered to the wealthy of the Porfirio Díaz era. These early residents built large mansions, many with French influence, and many still remain. Middle class residents moved in soon afterwards, and building and rebuilding over the 20th century has introduced a number of architectural styles. These buildings include some of the first works by Luis Barragán and today 383 are classified as having historic value.

In the 1940s and 1950s, the area was home to a number of important theatrical and movie theaters. Most of the movie theaters have since closed, but ten important stage theaters remain, and have performances seven days a week. The colonia is still home to the Jardín del Arte Sunday art market, which has inspired other such market such as the one in the San Ángel neighborhood in the south of the city. the colonia had been in decline with the abandonment of mansions as wealthier residents left. However, more recently the colonia has seen an upswing in development as young artists and galleries have moved into the area. Many artists have found Colonia San Rafael less expensive, accessible and more dynamic than trendy Colonia Condesa or Colonia Roma.

== Location ==
The boundaries of the colonia are formed by the following streets: Sullivan and Parque Via on the south, Ribera de San Cosme to the north, Avenida Insurgentes on the east and Circuito Interior Melchor Ocampo on the west. The colonia covers 53 city blocks and 105.32 hectares with approximately 24,000 inhabitants. The colonia is considered highly susceptible to earthquake damage. All these streets join with the Ribera de San Cosme, a hectic corridor that forms the area's northern border.

== Architecture and landmarks ==
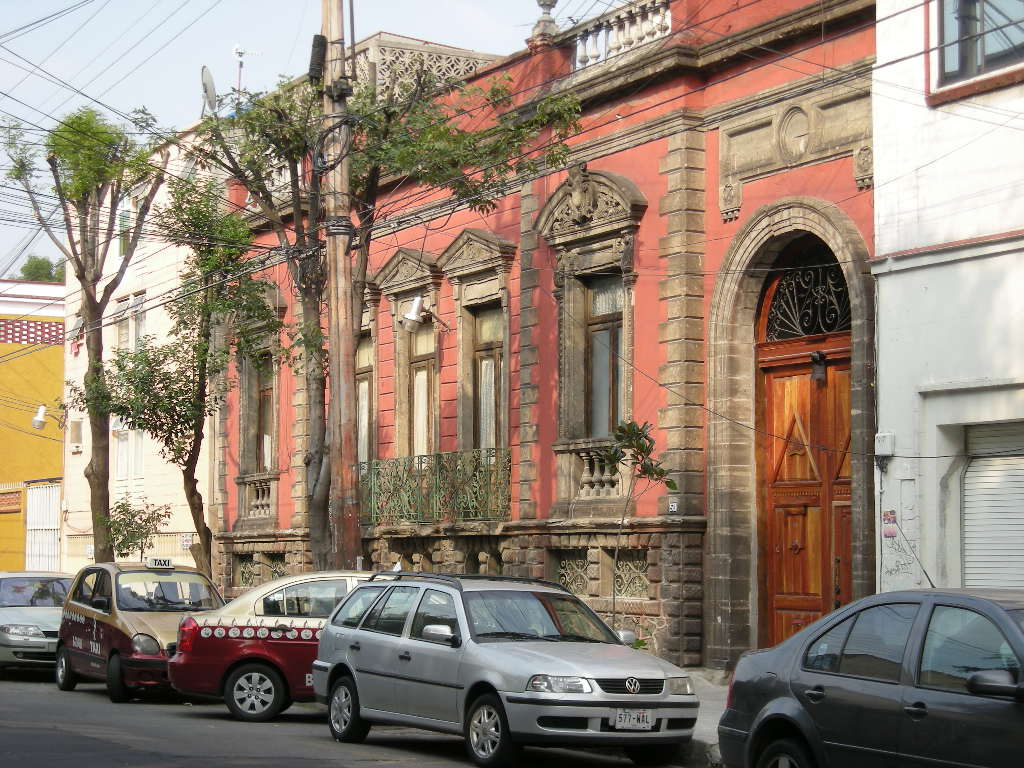
Former mansion on Velázquez de León Street

Much of the development of the colonia occurred during the Porfirio Díaz period (1870s to 1910), when a number of architectural styles were used and mixed. The earliest constructions consisted of elegant private homes of wealthy Mexico City residents. Most of the remaining homes of this type can be found on streets such as Sadi Carnot, Sarapio Rendon, and Rosas Moreno. Many of these are French style mansions, similar to those found in Colonia Roma . Subsequent development and redevelopment has added just about all of the remaining architectural influences of the 20th century. There are houses from the 1920s with geometric decorative features such as that on F. Pimental as well as Art Deco from the 1930s and 1940s on A. del Castillo Street and more modern styles from the 1950s. There are also modern apartment buildings, traditional businesses such as corner stores, Chinese-Mexican cafes, bars and cantinas. Some of the first works by Luis Barragán were realized here. 383 of its buildings have been catalogued for their historic value.

There are three churches in the colonia with the most important being the San Cosme Church, which was founded in 1575 by Juan de Zumárraga over the ruins of an earlier hermitage dedicated to Saints Cosmas and Damian. This hermitage was built on what is now the Ribera de San Cosme but then was the country road that connected Mexico City with then-independent city of Tacuba. The church's original purpose was evangelization of the natives of the area, and had a hospital for them. In 1669, the Franciscans converted the site into a charity collection center with the name of Santa María de la Consolación. The first stone of the current church was placed three years later in 1672 with a monastery constructed next door. The work was completed in 1675. Later, it became a parish church, as the monks handed both the church and monastery to regular clergy in 1854. This hospital was secularized to a military hospital, but these facilities were soon moved to the old San Pedro and San Pablo College in 1861. The parish church as a large collection of religious and colonial era art and has a Churrigueresque altarpiece from the 18th century. It was declared a national monument in 1931.

The Nuestra Señora de Guadalupe Church was built in 1952 in a modern design by architect Francisco J. Serrano. He also built the Teresay Encanto Cinemas on S. Rendon Street, but it was destroyed by an earthquake. Another church is located on San Rafael Street. It has a large radial window and balconies but no towers.

The Jardin del Arte, or Art Garden, is a non-profit organization that sponsors the Sunday outdoor art market on Sullivan Street. The association has its own formal rules, such as the one prohibiting the sale of copies of other works. All works sold by participating artists must be originals. The weekly event and organization was founded in 1955, and has spurred other similar market such as the weekend art market in Plaza de El Carmen in the San Ángel colonia. Currently, the association has as members about 700 painters who exhibit and sell their works. The market takes place on a small park located next to the Monumento a la Madre. Despite the market, the park has suffered serious deterioration over the past 20 years due to crime, nearby prostitution and the proliferation of non-art street vendors. While the homeless and other vendors clear out for the Sunday market, they dominate the park for the rest of the week. The result has been graffiti, garbage, dog waste and playgrounds in poor conditions. In fact, by Sunday, the smell can be strong enough that art vendors need to clean with detergent and pine cleaner before setting up. The Cuauhtémoc borough invested 5 million pesos for cleaning, repairs and the improvement of drainage and lighting, and the homeless were expelled from the park in 2005, but area residents complain that the problems have returned.

The colonia is home to two cemeteries, which were built for foreigners. The English cemetery was built in 1824 for Protestants, who were not accepted into Catholic cemeteries. This cemetery was the first of its kind in the country, it was closed in 1926. In 1980, the rest of the remains here were exhumed in order to transform the area into the Juan Ruiz de Alarcón Cultural Center, conserving the neo colonial chapel by Charles Hall built in 1909 called the Capilla Britannica. The exhumed remains were moved to the Nuevo Panteón Inglés. The area is the colonia's only true park space, with the open air theater housing concerts and art exhibits. Next to the English cemetery is the American cemetery, which contains the remains of U.S. soldiers who died during the invasion of Mexico City during the Mexican American War, especially from the Battle of Molino del Rey and the Battle of Chapultepec . Although it is also closed, each morning, there is a ceremony honoring the unknown soldier. This cemetery is also closed to new burials. Both cemeteries were reduced in size when the Consulado River was encased and the Circuito Interior built.

The Universidad del Valle de México building was a mansion built in 1901 in French style and initially used as a family residence when the area was still the Los Arquitectos colonia. After this family moved out, it became the site of the Junta Central de Conciliacion y Arbitraje in the 1940s. In the 1960s, it began to be rented by the Instituto Harvard, today the Universiad del Valle de Mexico. While much of its interior and facade has suffered changes over the years, the building is considered in good condition.

A site on Sullivan Street was most recently the home of the Foro Isabelino, but it hosted several artistic venues. In 1953, German artist Mathias Goeritz established here the experimental museum called “El Eco,” which was designed as a space “dedicated to emotional culture.) However, two years later the building was converted into a bar due to financial reasons. In the 1960s, it was reopened as the Centro Universitario de Teatro (CUT or University Center of Theatre). The building was demolished in 1967, and in its place, the Lope de Vega Hall, better known as the Foro Isabelino took over for the old CUT. In 1973, it became the site of a university student takeover, by non-theater students demanding space to realize their own productions. When the students succeeded in their demands, they founded two theatrical companies that performed here. The building has since been catalogued as a heritage site by INBA, but theatrical operations were closed down in 1997. Today, the building is abandoned.

On Miguel E. Schultz Street is a building that was once a federal jail, which briefly held Fidel Castro and Che Cuevara in 1956 after the Mexican government found out they were preparing to militarily confront the Fulgencio Batista regime in Cuba from Mexican soil. This prison ceased operating sometime in the 1980s. Another abandoned landmark is the mansion located on the corner of Rosas Moreno and Antonio Caso, which used to be the Russian embassy. In the 1980s, it was abandoned then suffered a fire. Today it is a shell with much of its roof caved in. All that remains intact is the pink stone decorative features on its facade. Other important sites in the neighborhood include the Hilario Galguera gallery on Francisco Pimentel Street, the Hotel Plaza on Sullivan Street (built in 1945 by Mario Pani), the Museo Universitario de Ciencias y Arte (MUCA) on Circuito Interior and the Valle de Mexico Masonic Lodge, established in 1945 and currently has 5,000 members.

== Socioeconomics ==
From its beginning, the colonia has been home to a mix of socioeconomic classes, with small businesses owned by the lower middle class located in grand buildings, which mostly now hold cultural or large business institutions. It is a mix of traditional and modern architecture as the area is in transition. It is a traditional neighborhood filled with mom-and-pop stores, workshops to repair anything from electronics to shoes, small eateries, many cantinas, shops that sell only fresh chicken, Chinese-Mexican cafes, and even men who come around to sharpen knives and collect scrap iron and newspapers. In a number of sections, its streets are filled with people during the day and neighbors can often be seen chatting on sidewalks and in local markets. The main festival of the year has been that of Saints Cosmas and Damian since the beginning of the neighborhood and is celebrated each year on 27 September. It is celebrated with music, fireworks and foods such as pozole, enchiladas with mole sauce, quesadillas with squash flowers and atole. Here rich and poor alike eat and enjoy the events in the same space. Many of the interiors of the old mansions have been remodeled into apartments that average about 90m2 in size with two bedrooms, conserving the original facade. Most, including many artists, who live here are attracted by the area's past charm, reasonable prices and do not want to live far from the city center.

Until recently, the colonia was in decline after Line 2 of the Metro and the Circuito Interior arterial road were built in the 1960s and 1970s. This caused many of the colonia's wealthier residents to move out, leaving behind Porfirian era mansions that are either abandoned, invaded by squatters or converted into tenements, despite the fact that 383 buildings in the area have been catalogued as cultural heritage sites. In a number of areas, nearly all of the buildings have been converted for commercial use, leaving the streets empty and quiet at night. During the day, most of its streets are saturated with cars, especially Sullivan, and Sadi Carnot streets, as cars look for ways to get between the Circuito Interior and Insurgentes. The main problems for the colonia today are crime, traffic, prostitution and unregulated street vendors, with the most common crime being car theft, followed by prostitution and robbery. Recently, however, many artists and galleries have begun to move into the area, attracted by historic buildings and lower rents.

While it was built as a residential area to those wanting to escape the city, today, some areas of the neighborhood have street vendors who set up shop on sidewalks and streets. These vendors mostly sell food, unlicensed CDs and DVDs, crafts and clothes. Street vendors are most heavily concentrated on the Ribera de San Cosme, especially between Insurgentes and Naranjo Streets. There is an estimated 2,200 street vendors in the colonia with about 500 of them on Ribera de San Cosme alone. They continue to proliferate, blocking sidewalks and even partially blocking roadways especially on Ribera de San Cosme, Serapio Rendon, Miguel E. Schutlz and Rosas Moreno. Another area where vendors congregate during the day is Sullivan Street.

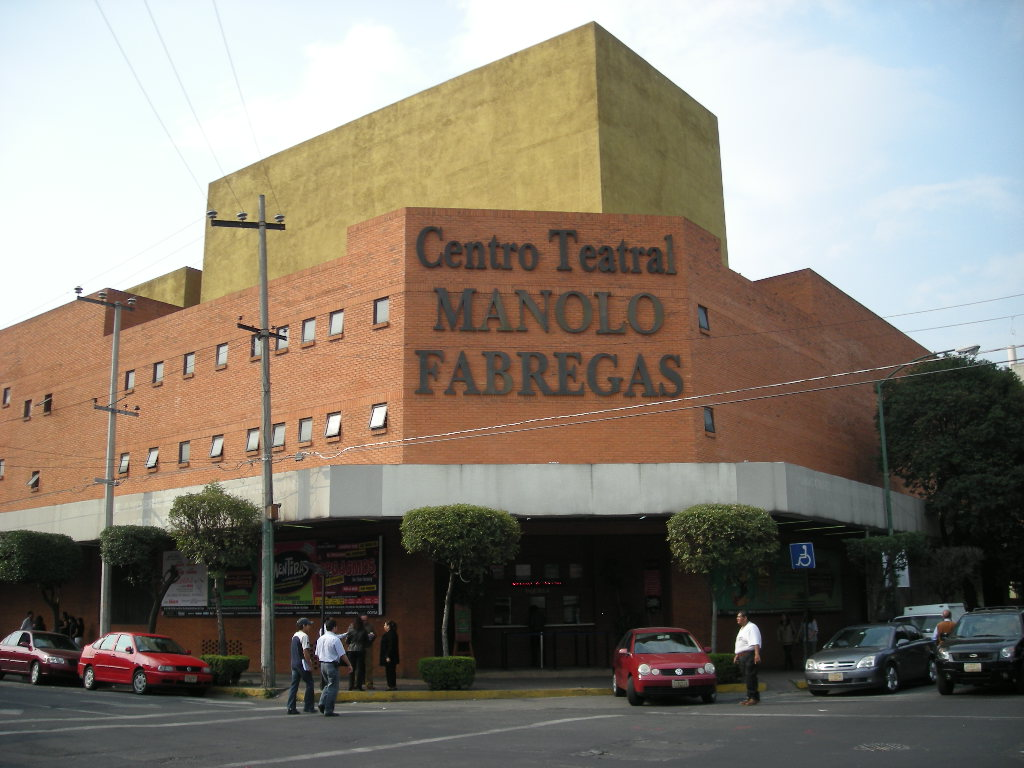
Manolo Fabregas Theatre

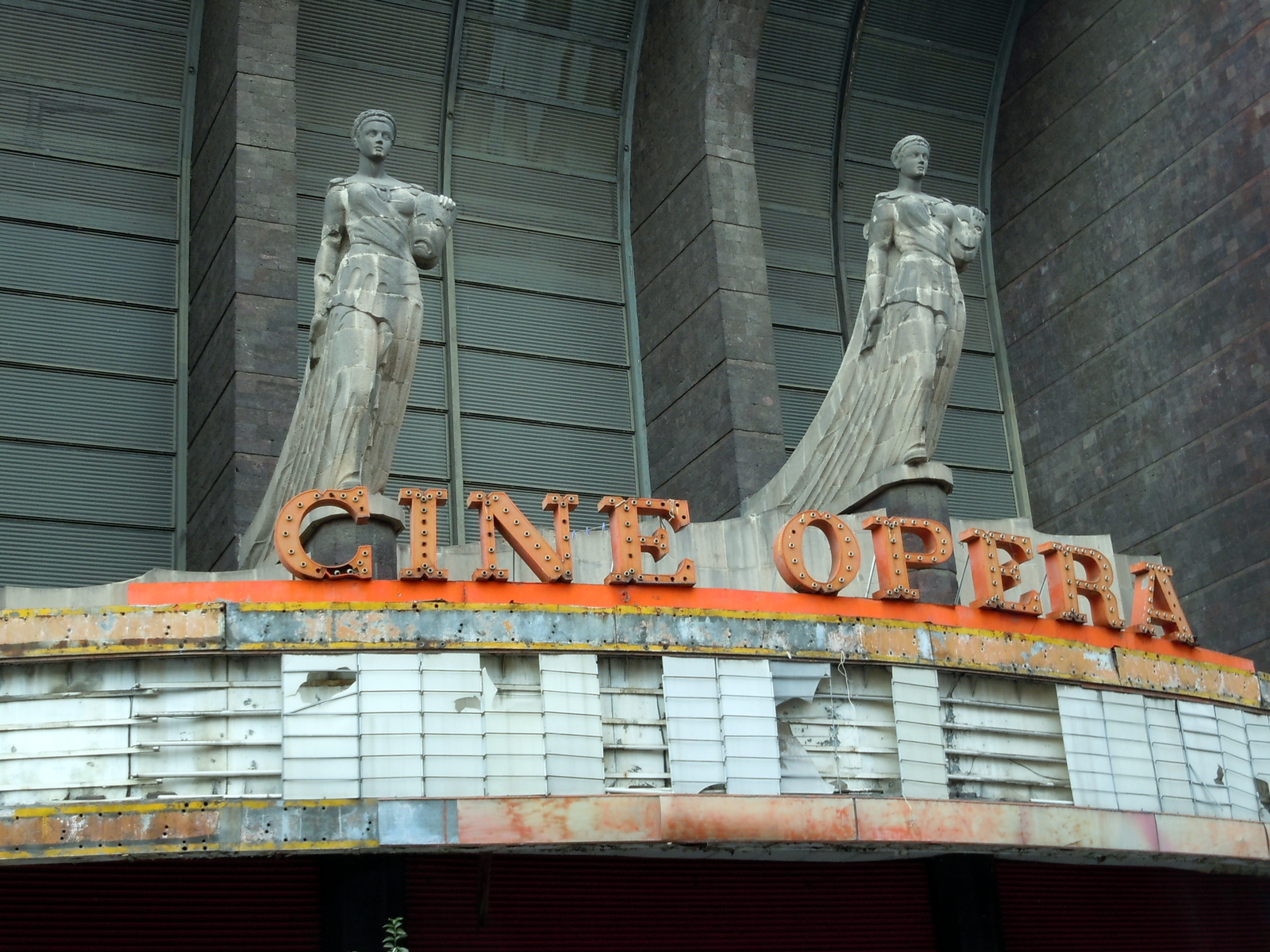
Abandonded, the Cine Ópera

Since the 1940s, the area has been known for its theatres, both live theatres and movie theaters. The area has been called the “Broadway of Mexico,” as it is home to ten major theaters with show comedic and dramatic plays seven days a week with a seating capacity of over 6,000 people. However, the stage theatre in this area is in decline. In 1999, the Aldama Theater on Rosas Moreno closed, which had operated for 13 years. It was considered one of the most important stage theaters in the city. It was particularly known for the production of Cinderella and others for children. The colonia was home to some of the most important movie theatres in the city in the 1940s and 1950s, when it was popular to spend Sunday afternoon at the matinee, watching movies featuring El Santo, Gastón Santos and Pedro Infante as well as films from Hollywood. These theaters included Cosmos, Veronica, Tlacopan and Naur, all on or near the Ribera San Cosme. Others include Briseno, Roxi and Encanto. One distinctive theater was the Roble, on Paseo de la Reforma, which has marble statues of Greek gods and a theater curtain from Holland. However, almost all of these theaters have closed down or have been converted to other purposes. The most important of these closed movie houses is the Cine Ópera, which had seating for almost 4,000 people. The Cine Encanto theater was built by Francisco Serrano and inaugurated in 1937 on Serapio Rendón Street. During its time, it was the only movie house where one could see a film for only three pesos. Its lighting was such as to optimize viewing in the dark. The theater suffered significant damage in the 1957 earthquake, which caused it to be demolished some time later.

Sullivan Street and Parque Via are known for prostitution as one of the oldest “tolerance zones” where police generally do not interfere. It is the best known of these zones, which also include the La Merced Market area and San Antonio Abad Street. At one point, it was estimated that 200 prostitutes could be found on the streets between 10pm and 5 am Monday to Saturday. In 2004, there were three houses of prostitution on Sullivan Street, but most ply their trade on the streets and in nearby cheap hotels. Prostitution began to move into this area in the 1980s and by the late 1990s, has grown so much that there was an attempt to regulate the activity. In 1997, groups representing the prostitutes and neighborhood residents signed an accord to try and regulate the activities and visibility of the prostitutes. Prostitutes were supposed to stay only on Sullivan Street and Parque Via between the hours of 8pm and 1am, not drink alcohol, carry identification cards and be moderate in the dress in exchange for police tolerance. However, the prostitutes here are well-established, even stating protests against laws they deem detrimental to their welfare. Despite the accord, prostitutes can be found, as far away as Puente de Alvarado and working from as early as 11 am to very early in the morning. A number of established businesses have claimed that the open prostitution hurts their business such as a VIPS restaurant that states that the number of patrons decreases significantly at night. Beginning in 2010 new businesses, art galleries and establishments moved into the area displacing sex workers.

== History ==
In the pre-Hispanic period, much of this area was covered by Lake Texcoco . However, it also contained the causeway that connected Tenochtitlan (Mexico City) to the city of Tacuba on the lakeshore. It was this path Hernán Cortés used to escape on La Noche Triste By the 17th century, enough of the lake had dried that the area was covered by farms. It also was the terminus of one of the Mexico City's two main aqueducts, the Santa Fe, that brought in fresh potable water.

In 1860, a parcel of land in this area—then just outside the city limits— was subdivided into 60 plots to create the exclusive colonia of Los Arquitectos. Sadi Carno Street was the site of military stables around this same time. Some of the first non-farm elements that were constructed here were “tivolis” or recreation gardens with restaurants and other services to cater to those who wished to spend time outside the city. By the end of the 19th century, Mexico City was breaking out of its traditional boundaries westward over former haciendas and ranches. Country homes for the elite were being constructed, which eventually became permanent. To reach these homes and the tivoli gardens, mule-drawn trains were established along what is now Ribera de San Cosme. The first permanent city residents of the area were part of the upper classes that benefitted from the economic policies of Porfirio Díaz. They were soon followed by shopkeepers and laborers. as well as middle class developed from the rise of industry in Mexico.

In 1879, the arches of the Santa Fe Aqueduct, (constructed in 1779) were demolished as lead piping was installed to deliver potable water to many areas of Mexico City. Another major infrastructure project was the construction of the Estacion Colonia rail station, which serviced the newly constructed rail link between Mexico City and the north and west of the country. What is now the Circuito Interior road was the Consulado River and the La Veronica Road. This road has a Baroque fountain that provided potable water to the area but this was demolished in 1879 when lead piping was introduced.

Most of the colonia is situated on the former ranch of San Rafael or El Cebollón. This ranch was sold to developers Enrique Trón, León Signorel and Eduardo Garcia in 1890. These men worked to subdivided and develop the land into a residential neighborhood, which was legally established in 1891. The boundaries of the colonia also include blocks from the old Arquitectos colonia on the east side. It was the seventh developed city neighborhood, and one of the first established outside the historic center. It was one of the new “modern” colonias in the early 20th century, with a square layout that later colonias copied. Most of the street names were traditional to Mexico City such as Calzada de la Veronica, Ferrocarril de Toluca and Artes e Industria. Some of these were later changed to the names of important people of the early 20th century such as Gabino Barreda, Guillermo Prieto, Ignacio Altamirano, James Sullivan and Thomas Alva Edison. However, it lacked a number of features of the more upscale neighborhoods such as Colonia Condesa such as large parks and traffic medians and circles planted with trees. However, the area attracted a number of famous residents such as Conservative writer and philosopher Lucas Alamán, and Joaquín García Icazbalceta. The latter had a property that covered an entire city block and doubled as a zoo. Two of Benito Juárez’s daughters also lived here, in the area where the Cine Opera was eventually built.

Since its heyday at the turn of the 19th and 20th centuries, many of the large homes built here have been replaced, modified or abandoned with many lots subdivided. One reason that the colonia declined was the building of Line 2 of the Metro along Ribera de San Cosme Avenue, making this street a main corridor for the city. This bought in crowds of people, which then led to the construction of stores, hotels and nightclubs, which was often unregulated. This, in turn, caused many of the area's wealthier residents to move out. The Circuito Interior was constructed in 1973. The 1985 Mexico City earthquake did significant damage here, and buildings since then have fallen due to structural damage related to the quake.

For the first decade of the 21st century, there have been efforts to conserve the heritage of the colonial, rescuing various historic buildings, and improving the image of the area with the construction of new theaters. However, many of the older buildings in the area have not been catalogued or studied.

== Transportation ==
=== Public transportation ===
The area is served by the Mexico City Metro and Metrobús. While it is not located in the neighborhood, Revolución metro station is within walking distance.

Metro stations

- San Cosme

Metrobus stations

- Reforma
- Plaza de la República

== See also ==
The Anglo Mexican Foundation
