= Monumento a la Madre, Guadalajara =

Statue in Guadalajara, Jalisco, Mexico

Monumento a la Madre
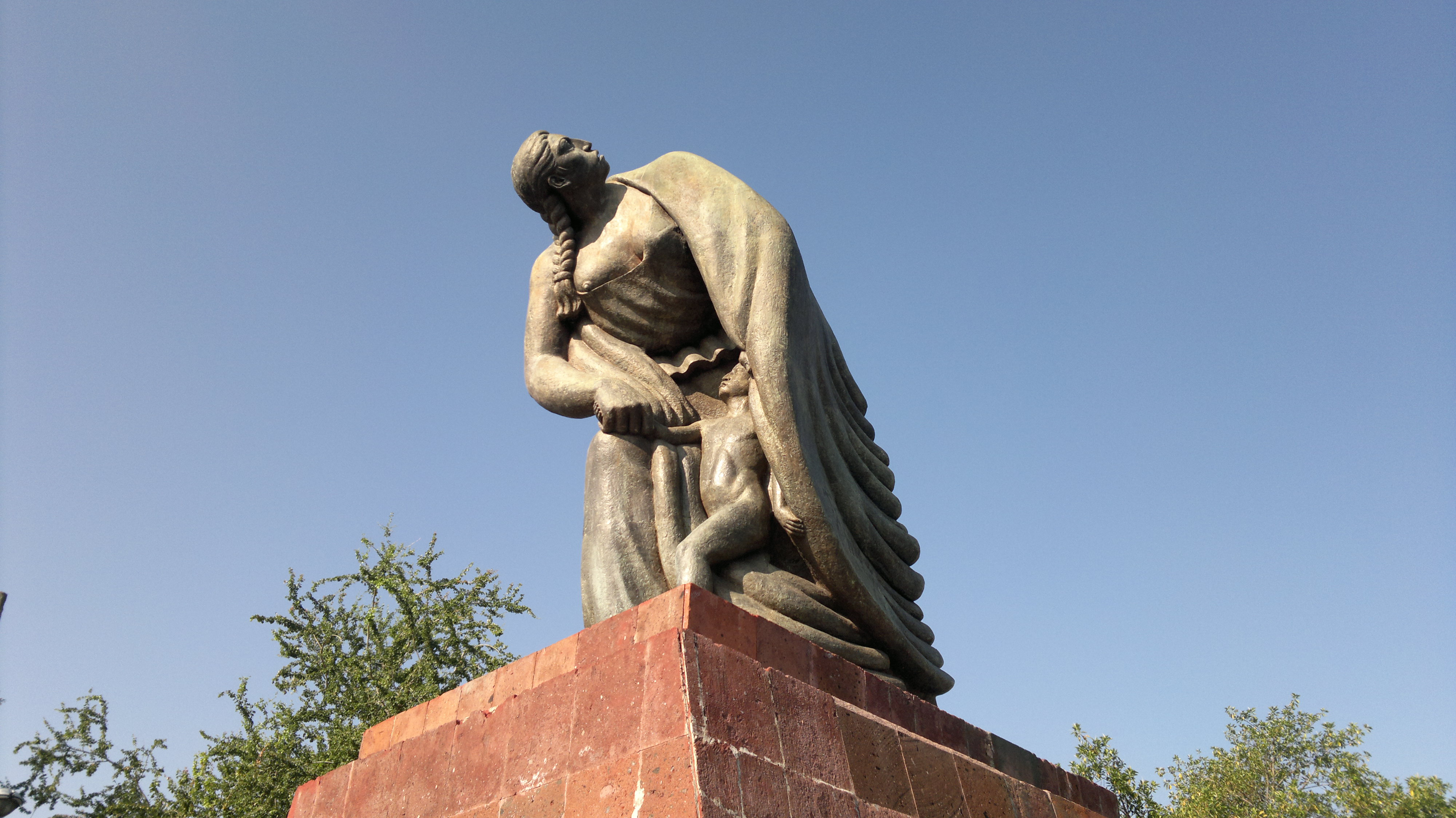
- The statue in 2011
- Year: 1956
- Medium: Bronze
- Subject: Mother
- Location: Guadalajara, Jalisco, Mexico; 20°41′20.6″N 103°20′9″W

The Monumento a la Madre (lit. 'Monument to the Mother') is installed in Guadalajara, in the Mexican state of Jalisco. It features an indigenous woman looking at the sky while she covers her child. It is a bronze statue that lies on a volcanic rock base. It lies along Plaza 10 de Mayo and it was inaugurated in 1956.

== See also ==
- Monumento a la Madre, Mexico City
