= Campillo de Aragón =

Campillo de Aragón, Spain
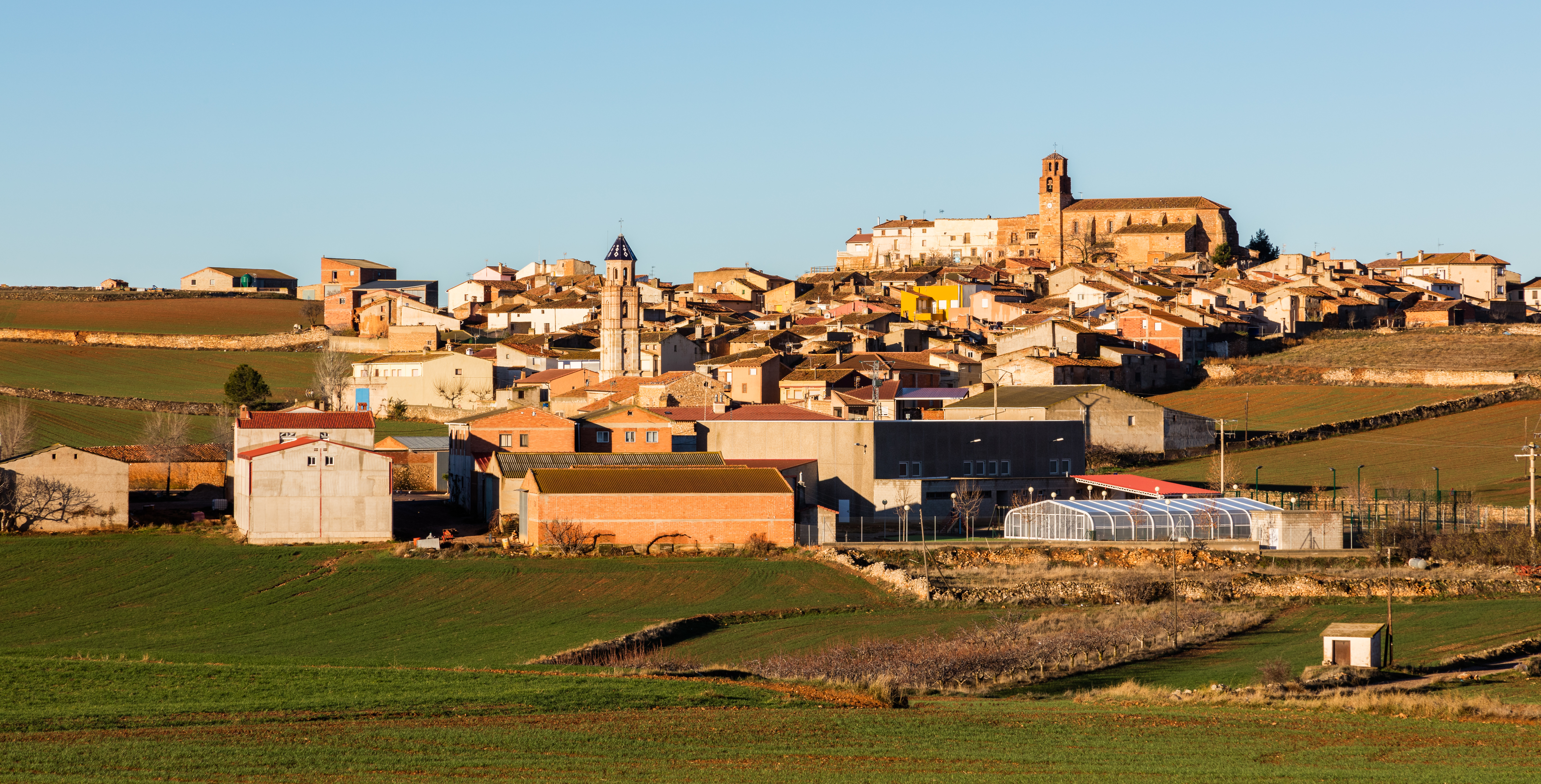

- Flag Coat of arms

- Location within Aragon Location within Spain Location within Europe
- Country: Spain
- Autonomous community: Aragon
- Province: Zaragoza
- Municipality: Campillo de Aragón

Area
  - Total: 36 km^{2} (14 sq mi)

Population (2025-01-01)
  - Total: 111
  - Density: 3.1/km^{2} (8.0/sq mi)
- Time zone: UTC+1 (CET)
  - Summer (DST): UTC+2 (CEST)

Campillo de Aragón is a municipality located in the province of Zaragoza, Aragon, Spain. According to the 2004 census (INE), the municipality has a population of 173 inhabitants.

== See also ==
- List of municipalities in Zaragoza
