= César Monasterio (footballer) =

Argentine footballer and manager (born 1971)

Personal information
- Full name: César Leonardo Monasterio
- Date of birth: July 10, 1971 (age 55)
- Place of birth: San Miguel de Tucumán, Argentina
- Height: 1.90 m (6 ft 3 in)
- Position: Goalkeeper

Senior career*
| Years | Team | Apps | (Gls) |
| 1993–1995 | Deportivo Morón | 56 | (0) |
| 1995–1998 | Platense | 69 | (0) |
| 1998–1999 | Brown de Arrecifes | 34 | (0) |
| 1999–2000 | Independiente Rivadavia | 9 | (0) |
| 2000–2001 | Oriente Petrolero | 32 | (0) |
| 2001–2008 | San Martín SJ | 218 | (0) |
| 2008–2009 | Estudiantes (BA) | 40 | (0) |
| 2009–2012 | Almirante Brown | 97 | (0) |
| 2013–2016 | Deportivo Laferrere | 93 | (0) |

Managerial career
- 2019–2020: Deportivo Laferrere
- * Club domestic league appearances and goals

César Leonardo Monasterio (born July 10, 1971, in San Miguel de Tucumán) is an Argentine retired football goalkeeper and current manager.

== Career ==
Monasterio started his playing career in 1993 with Deportivo Morón. Between 1995 and 1998 he played in the Argentine Primera with Platense.

In 1998, he moved down a division to play for Brown de Arrecifes and then Independiente Rivadavia. In 2000–2001, he had a spell in Bolivia with Oriente Petrolero before returning to Argentina to play for San Martín de San Juan, in 2007 the club secured promotion to the Argentine Primera. After seven years and over 200 appearances for San Martín, Monasterio joined Club Atlético Estudiantes from Caseros, Buenos Aires in 2008.

== Managerial career ==
After retiring, Monasterio stayed in football, working in the technical staff of Nueva Chicago and later also Barracas Central. In June 2019, he was appointed manager of his former club, Deportivo Laferrere.
