= Campillo de Ranas =

Campillo de Ranas, Spain
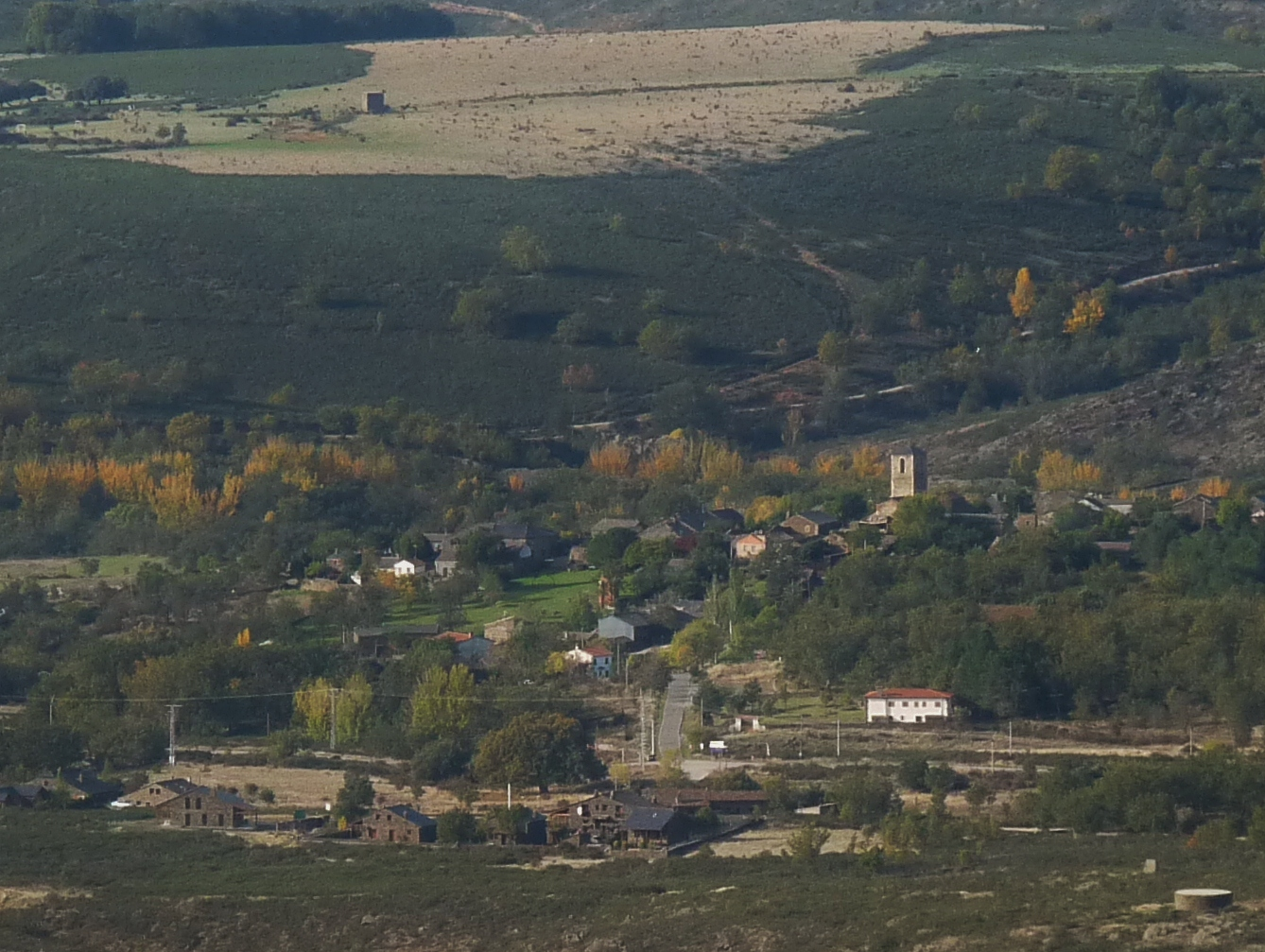

- Location within Province of Guadalajara Location within Castilla-La Mancha Location within Spain
- Coordinates: 41°05′08″N 3°18′51″W
- Country: Spain
- Autonomous community: Castile-La Mancha
- Province: Guadalajara
- Municipality: Campillo de Ranas

Area
  - Total: 91 km^{2} (35 sq mi)

Population (2025-01-01)
  - Total: 150
  - Density: 1.6/km^{2} (4.3/sq mi)
- Time zone: UTC+1 (CET)
  - Summer (DST): UTC+2 (CEST)

Campillo de Ranas is a municipality located in the province of Guadalajara, Castile-La Mancha, Spain. According to the 2004 census (INE), the municipality has a population of 184 inhabitants.
