= Campillo (surname) =

The surname Campillo may refer to:

- Gabriel Campillo (born 19 December 1978), boxer
- Jorge Campillo (born August 10, 1978), baseball player
- José del Campillo (1695–1743), Spanish statesman
- José Ramón Rodil, 1st Marquis of Rodil (1789–1853), general and statesman, full surname "Rodil y Campillo"
- Jacinto Campillo, birth name of Pupi Campo, Cuban-American band leader
- Robin Campillo (born 1962), French director and screenwriter
