= Pablo Ortiz Monasterio =

Mexican photographer, writer and editor (born 1952)

Ortiz Monasterio in 2024

Pablo Ignacio Ortiz Monasterio Prieto is a Mexican photographer, writer and editor born in Mexico City in 1952. He is internationally recognized as a representative artist of Mexican contemporary photography.

== Early life and education ==
Pablo Ortiz Monasterio was born in Mexico City in 1952 and is the fourth son of the plastic surgeon Fernando Ortiz Monasterio and Leonor Prieto. In his youth, his parents used to travel frequently and narrate their experiences to their children using transparencies. He says that the possibility of narrating experiences using images was something that marked him forever. When Ortiz Monasterio was 16, he discovered the work of French photographer Bernard Plossu, and that is when he decided that he wanted to be a photographer. He studied economics at the National Autonomous University of Mexico, but during the 1970s he moved to London and studied photography at the London College of Printing.

== Career ==
Ortiz Monasterio returned to Mexico at the beginning of the 1980s, and in 1982 he edited a book called Los pueblos del viento (1982). In 2010, Ortiz Monasterio presented a photo-book called Montaña Blanca which he started in 1992. In this project, he spent 13 years visiting towns near to the volcanos Popocatépetl and Iztaccíhuatl to capture how two geological phenomena have a very strong impact on Mexican culture. The book includes literary texts written by Margo Glantz, Antonio Saborit and Alfonso Morales and it is divided by different readings. The first is the Mexican legend of origins of the bronze race, the second is a reflection on gender which inquires into the question of why these volcanoes are considered male and female. The third is a popular and idealized representation of the pre-Hispanic past and, finally, a chronicle about the mixture of the photography genres.

In 2013, Ortiz Monasterio was one of the twenty artists selected to photograph some of Russia's most symbolic places. He decided to work at the Akadem Gorodok ("Academic City") in Novosibirsk, where he spent ten days photographing every single thing that constitute the laboratory constructed by the physician Gersh Budker which, until the 1990s, was the most important and advanced site in matters of nuclear energy. The photo-book contains 50 pictures, a literary text by José Manuel Prieto and a poem by Tito Lucrecio Caro. In Ortiz Monasterio's words, “With Akadem Gorodok the reader can imagine how it smells, see that there was dust, chaos, if he reads the pictures accurately he will get a lot of information that denotes the experience I had”. He also coordinated the book Frida Kahlo: sus fotos, directed the editorial projects Mexico indígena, Ríos de Luz, and Luna Córnea and wrote a book called Desaparecidos? in 2016 where he writes about the Ayotzinapa case.

== Works ==
=== Photography ===
==== Books ====
- 2009: Correspondencias Fotográficas co-written with Marcelo Bordsky, RM Verlag.
- 2010: Montaña Blanca, RM Verlag.
- 2010: Frida Kahlo: Sus Fotos, RM Verlag.
- 2012: A Través de la Máscara co-written with Vesta Monica Herrerias, Lunwerg.
- 2014: Akadem Gorodok, RM Verlag.
- 2016: Fluz Quito co-written with Claudi Carreras, RM Verlag.
- 2016: Desaparecen, RM Verlag.

=== Cultural contributions ===
Besides his job as a photographer, Ortiz Monasterio has been contributing in arts and culture by creating spaces for reflection, analysis, and photography distribution as well as exhibitions and galleries. He created, along with Víctor Flores Olea, the Centro de la Imagen and, in collaboration with Pedro Meyer, the Mexican Photography Council. Ortiz Monasterio also created the celebration of the 150 years of photography in Mexico, Luna Córnea, the Rio de Luz collection, and the first two Fotoseptiembre festivals which he describes as "a huge event that involves a lot of people and gain a lot of diversity".
