= Francisco Chíguil Figueroa =

Mexican politician (born 1961)

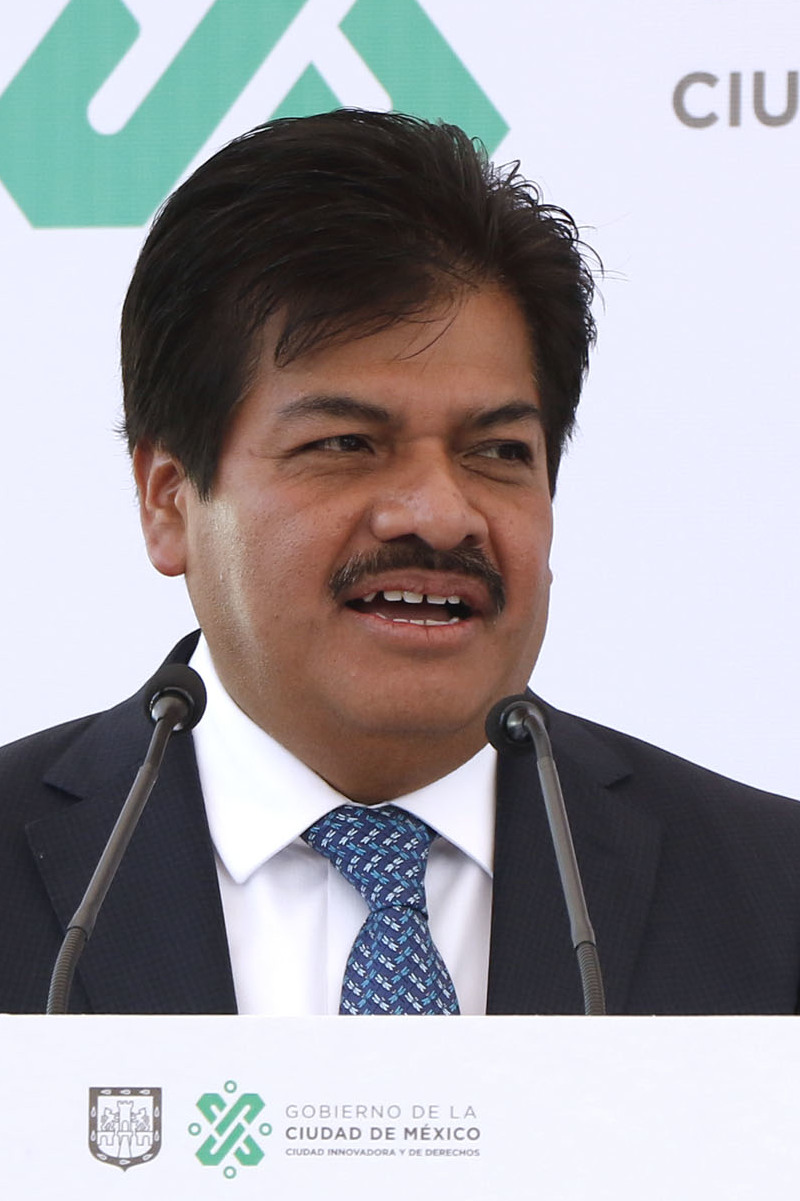
- Chíguil Figueroa in January 2019

Senator for Mexico City
- Preceded by: Omar García Harfuch
- Incumbent
- Assumed office 8 October 2024

Mayor of Gustavo A. Madero
- In office 1 October 2018 – 29 March 2024
- Preceded by: Víctor Hugo Lobo Román
- Succeeded by: Enrique Rojas Serafín

Borough Chief of Gustavo A. Madero
- In office 1 December 2006 – 25 June 2008
- Preceded by: Patricia Ruiz Anchondo
- Succeeded by: Luis Meneses Murillo

Member of the Legislative Assembly of the Federal District
- In office 15 September 2003 – 14 September 2006
- In office 15 September 1997 – 14 September 2000

Personal details
- Born: 4 October 1961 (age 64) San Andrés Tuxtla, Veracruz, Mexico
- Party: Morena
- Spouse: Beatriz Rojas Martínez
- Education: Economics and chemical engineering
- Alma mater: IPN, UAM

Francisco Chíguil Figueroa (Note: In this Spanish name, the first or paternal surname is Chíguil and the second or maternal family name is Figueroa.) (born 4 October 1961) is a Mexican economist, chemical engineer, and politician. A member of the National Regeneration Movement (Morena) who previously belonged to the Party of the Democratic Revolution (PRD), since 8 October 2024 he represents Mexico City in the Senate.

He previously served two terms in the Legislative Assembly of the Federal District and was elected to three terms as the borough chief (later: mayor) of Gustavo A. Madero, Mexico City.

== Political career ==
Francisco Chíguil was born on 4 October 1961 in San Andrés Tuxtla, Veracruz. He holds a bachelor's degree in chemical engineering from the National Polytechnic Institute (IPN) and a bachelor's and a master's in economics from the Metropolitan Autonomous University (UAM). In 2015 he completed a doctorate in economics at the IPN.

His political career began in 1997 when he was elected to a three-year term in the Legislative Assembly of the Federal District (ALDF) for the Party of the Democratic Revolution (PRD). In 2000, Gustavo A. Madero borough chief Joel Ortega Cuevas appointed him executive director of economic development in the borough. In 2003 he was elected to a second term in the ALDF.

In 2006, on the PRD ticket, he was elected borough chief of Gustavo A. Madero for the 2006–2008 term. He resigned his position on 25 June 2008 following a human stampede at the New's Divine nightclub in which 12 people were killed.

In 2018, as a member of the National Regeneration Movement (Morena), he was elected mayor of Gustavo A. Madero, and he was re-elected for a second consecutive term in 2021.

He took a leave of absence from his position as mayor in October 2023 in the run-up to the 2024 elections to coordinate Clara Brugada's successful campaign for election as head of government of Mexico City. At the same time, his name appeared on the ballot for the Senate election, as the alternate of Omar García Harfuch, the lead candidate of the Sigamos Haciendo Historia coalition in Mexico City.

Sigamos Haciendo Historia won the election in the capital and García Harfuch was duly elected to Mexico City's first Senate seat. However, President-elect Claudia Sheinbaum had previously announced that García Harfuch was to serve in her cabinet as secretary of security and citizen protection and, as his alternate, Chíguil Figueroa was sworn in his stead on 8 October 2024.

In the Senate, he serves on the standing committees for migratory affairs, economic development and entrepreneurship, and parliamentary rules and procedure.

== Personal life ==
Francisco Chíguil is married to fellow politician Beatriz Rojas Martínez.
