= Beatriz Rojas Martínez =

Mexican lawyer (born 1966)

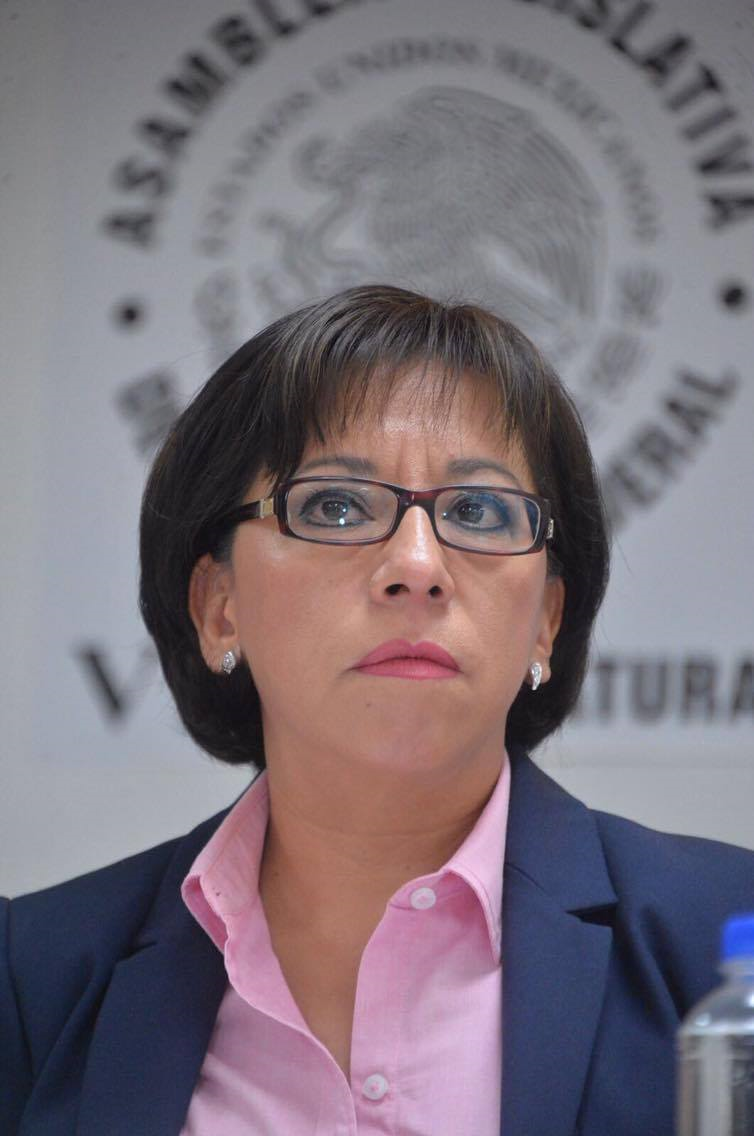
- Rojas in 2018

Director of the National System for Integral Family Development for Mexico City
- Incumbent
- Assumed office 23 October 2024
- Governor: Clara Brugada
- Preceded by: Esthela Damián Peralta

Member of the Chamber of Deputies of Mexico
- In office 29 August 2018 – 31 August 2024
- Preceded by: María Chávez García
- Succeeded by: Guillermo Rendón Gómez
- Constituency: 7th District of Mexico City

Deputy of the Congress of Mexico City
- In office 15 September 2015 – 19 March 2018
- Preceded by: Adrián Michel Espino
- Constituency: 6th District
- In office 16 September 2009 – 15 September 2012
- Preceded by: Juan Bustos Pascual
- Succeeded by: Adrián Michel Espino

Personal details
- Born: 21 December 1966 (age 59) Mexico City, Mexico
- Party: Morena
- Spouse: Francisco Chíguil Figueroa
- Education: Universidad del Valle de México
- Occupation: Lawyer, politician

Beatriz Rojas Martínez (Note: In this Spanish name, the first or paternal surname is Rojas and the second or maternal family name is Martínez.) (born 21 December 1966) is a Mexican lawyer and politician.

She has served as director of the National System for Integral Family Development for Mexico City since 23 October 2024. She was a federal deputy for the city's 7th district, corresponding to the Gustavo A. Madero borough, from 2018 to 2024, serving as secretary of the Gender Equality Commission for the 64th Legislature.

== Biography ==
Beatriz Rojas Martínez was born in Mexico City on 21 December 1966. In 2009 she earned a licentiate in law from the Universidad del Valle de México.

From 2009 to 2012 and 2015 to 2018, Rojas served as a local deputy in the Congress of Mexico City. Among her legislative activities, she promoted, in collaboration with women's civil society organizations, academics, and the Supreme Court of Mexico City, a series of reforms and modifications to the Penal Code and the Code of Criminal Procedure, harmonizing them with the Law on Women's Access to a Life Free of Violence. She codified the crime of femicide, which punishes anyone who takes the life of a woman for reasons of gender and with extreme violence, and amended the Law on Trafficking, establishing harsher penalties for those who violate the human rights of victims of trafficking, sexual exploitation, and labor exploitation.

She was elected to the federal Chamber of Deputies in 2018, and that October, she successfully petitioned the body to include the commemorative phrase LXIV Legislatura de la Paridad de Género (64th Legislature of Gender Parity) on its communication platform, as well as on official documentation and stationery.

She was named director of the National System for Integral Family Development for Mexico City on 23 October 2024.

Since 2016, together with María Salguero Bañuelos (creator of the Interactive Map of Femicide), Rojas has promoted visibility of the victims of femicide and to have the Gender Violence Against Women Alert issued in Mexico City, thus implementing mechanisms to safeguard the lives of women.
