= Escuela Cristóbal Colón =

Escuela Cristóbal Colón ("Christopher Columbus School") may refer to:

- Escuela Cristóbal Colón de la Salle (Mexico City)
- Escuela Cristóbal Colón (Puerto Rico)
- Escuela Zuliana de Avanzada “Cristóbal Colón” - Maracaibo, Venezuela
