= Claudia Águila =

Mexican politician

- Born: 29 October 1972 (age 53); Iztacalco, Federal District, Mexico
- Occupation: Politician
- Political party: PRD

Claudia Elena Águila Torres (Note: In this Mexican name, the surname is Águila and the second or maternal family name is Torres.) (born 29 October 1972) is a Mexican politician affiliated with the Party of the Democratic Revolution (PRD). In 2012–2015 she served as a federal deputy in the 62nd Congress, representing the Federal District's 7th electoral district.
