= New's Divine nightclub tragedy =

2008 human stampede in Mexico City

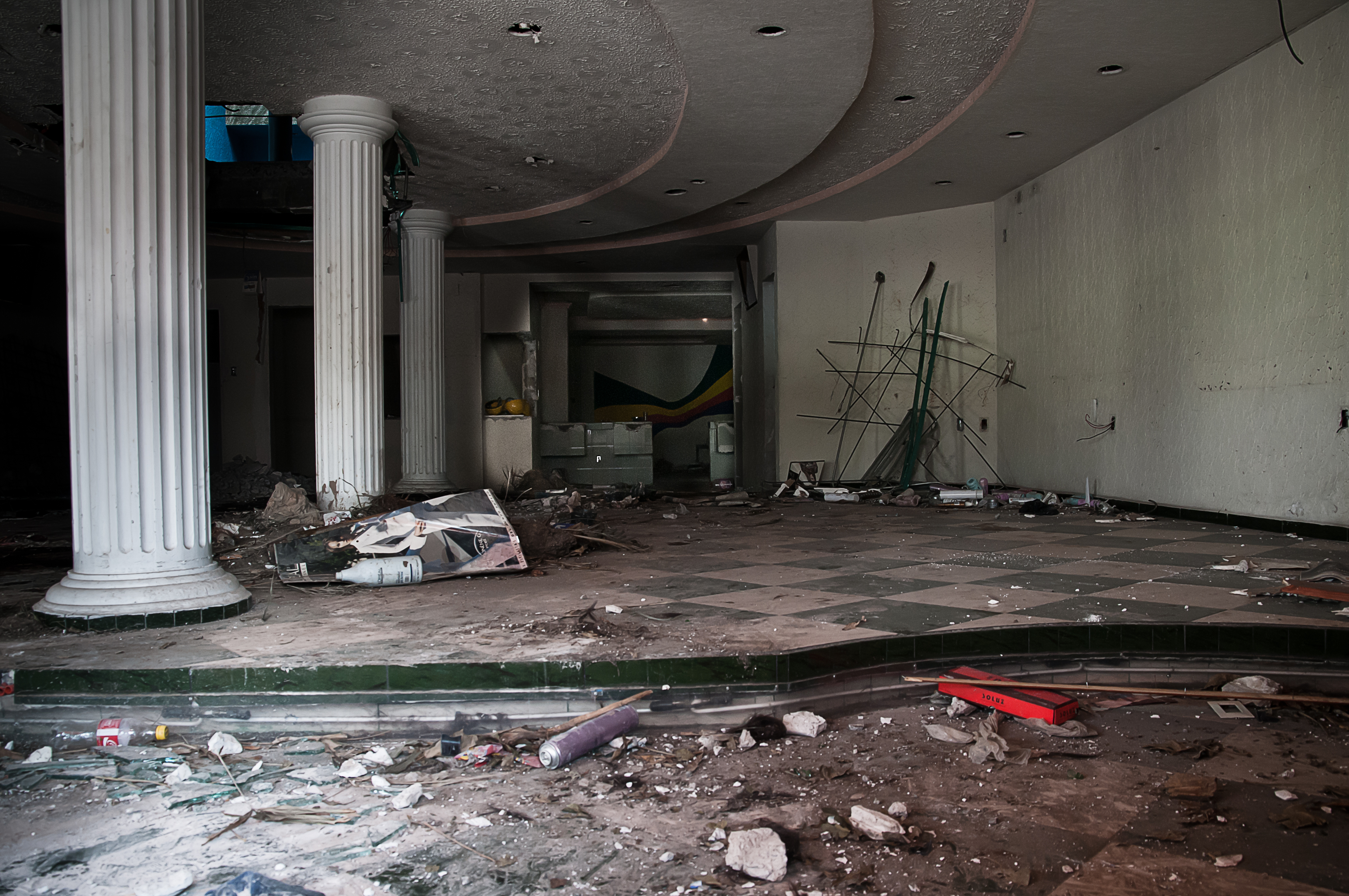
- The nightclub's entrance in March 2011
- Date: 20 June 2008
- Time: 18:00 CDT (UTC-5)
- Location: Gustavo A. Madero, Mexico City, Mexico; 19°30′00″N 99°05′19″E
- Cause: Stampede occurred after a police raid
- Deaths: 12

The New's Divine nightclub tragedy occurred at a nightclub located in the Gustavo A. Madero borough of Mexico City, where on the evening of 20 June 2008, according to the authorities's official version, a crowd crush occurred in which nine assistants and three police officers died following the nightclub's request to evacuate through the only exit. On the opposite, witnesses reported that after officers deployed tear gas and used force to control the crowd, attendees rushed toward the exit. Teenage girls later testified that they had been sexually abused.

The incident led to the creation of memorials, including the New's Divine Memorial, the naming of a nearby Metrobús station, and the installation of an anti-monument commemorating the victims.

== Background ==
The New's Divine nightclub was located on Avenida Ing. Eduardo Molina in the Gustavo A. Madero borough of Mexico City. It opened in 1996 and previously operated under the names Bingos and La Rocka before being renamed New's Divine in 2005. The nightclub was owned by Alfredo Maya Ortiz. It was authorized to admit minors during the afternoon and licensed to sell alcoholic beverages in the evening, provided they were not sold to minors. However, local residents reported that alcohol and drugs were being sold to minors inside the venue.

== Raid ==
On 20 June 2008, at approximately 18:00 CDT (UTC-5), 200 officers from the Secretariat of Public Security of the Federal District, under the command of Guillermo Zayas González, were deployed to conduct a police operation at the New's Divine nightclub. According to the official account, nightclub personnel announced over the loudspeakers that police were present and that patrons needed to evacuate. The announcement reportedly caused panic among those inside, who attempted to leave the venue. However, an order was issued to prevent anyone from exiting, causing a large number of people to crowd near the nightclub's only exit.

As the crowd surged toward the exit, both attendees and officers inside began to suffer from oxygen deprivation and compression caused by the crush. Nine attendees, aged between 13 and 29, died at the scene, along with three police officers. Also, an undetermined number of people resulted injuried.

On the opposite, witnesses reported that, following the evacuation announcement, people initially began leaving calmly. However, panic reportedly erupted when officers deployed tear gas and used force to control the crowd. Attendees rushed toward the exit, where officers stationed outside began detaining individuals regardless of their well-beings. Detainees were then loaded onto police and city transit buses. Several teenage girls later testified that they had been sexually abused and photographed while naked.

== Aftermath ==
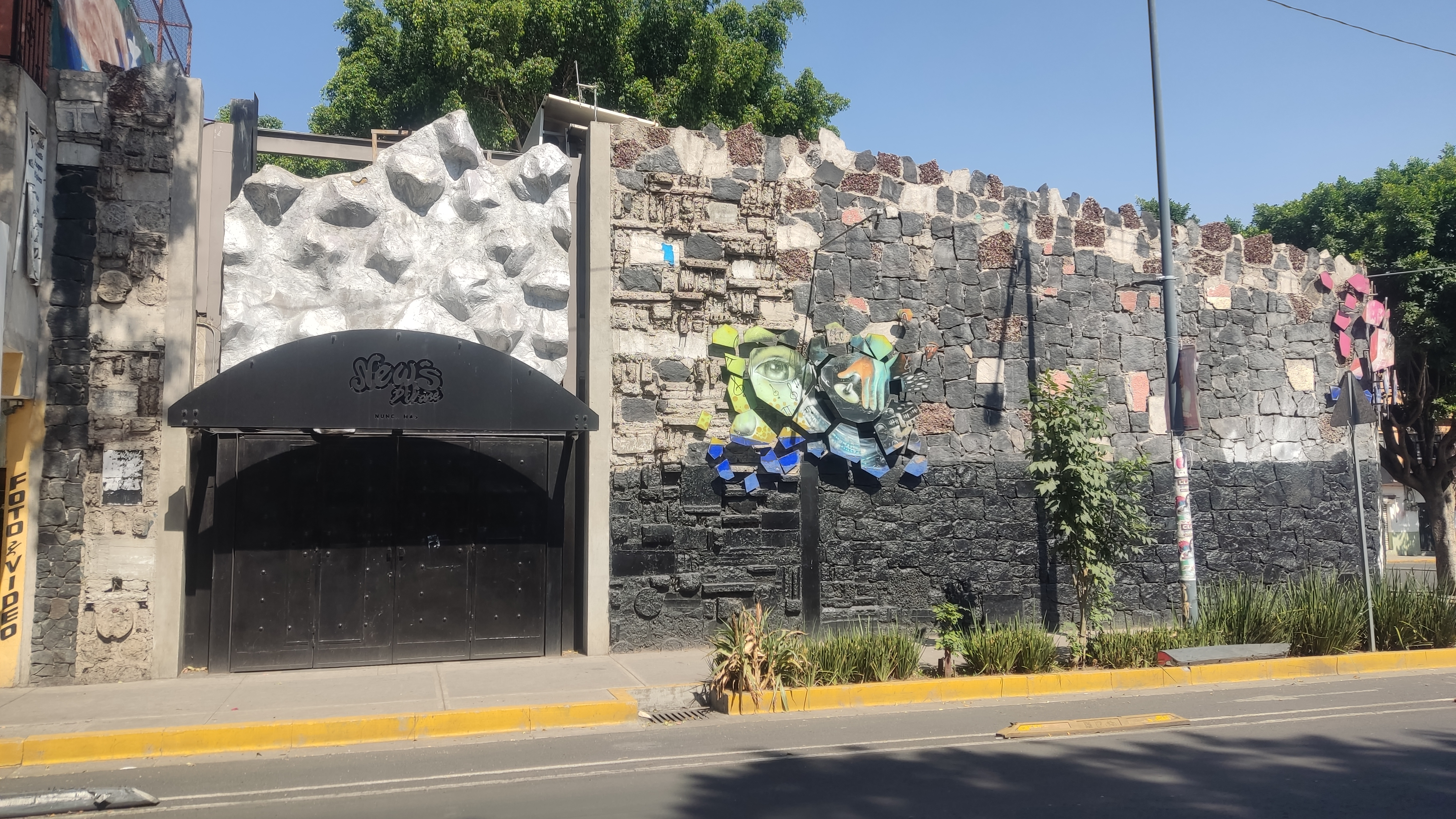
The memorial center in 2024

Marcelo Ebrard, the head of government of the Federal District at the time, acknowledged there were "serious mistakes". Zayas González was removed from his position. In 2022, the outstanding arrest warrants against him for 12 counts of negligent homicide and seven counts of negligent bodily injury were revoked after they expired, and he was exonerated. Maya Ortiz was arrested and served 15 years in prison.

=== Memorials ===
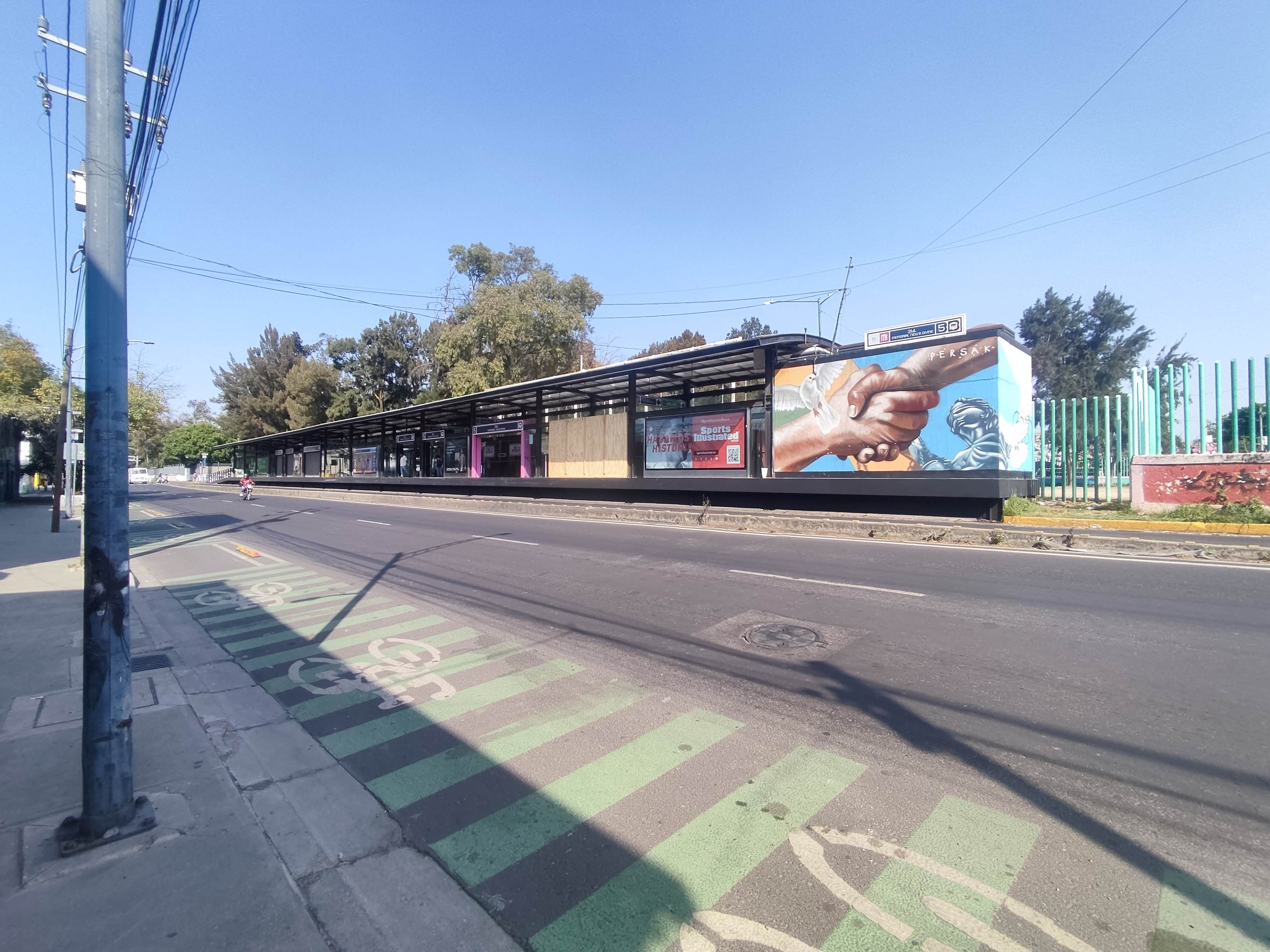
314. Memorial New's Divine station in 2025

Seven years after the crush, the victims' families restored the building that had housed the New's Divine nightclub and established a memorial known as the New's Divine Memorial. The nearby Line 5 Metrobús station, 314. Memorial New's Divine, was named after the tragedy. Its pictogram depicts a crowd of people attempting to exit a building, prompting criticism for being insensitive. The Metrobús system stated that the image was designed and approved by family members of the victims.

Eleven years after the crush, in 2019, an anti-monument was temporarily installed in the Zócalo, the main square in the historic center of Mexico City. A replica was installed in front of the government building of the Gustavo A. Madero borough, but was removed by the local authorities. In 2026, the local government returned the anti-monument and announced that it would be reinstalled.
