= 7th federal electoral district of Mexico City =

Federal electoral district of Mexico

Mexico City's 7th
- Electoral district of the Chamber of Deputies of Mexico

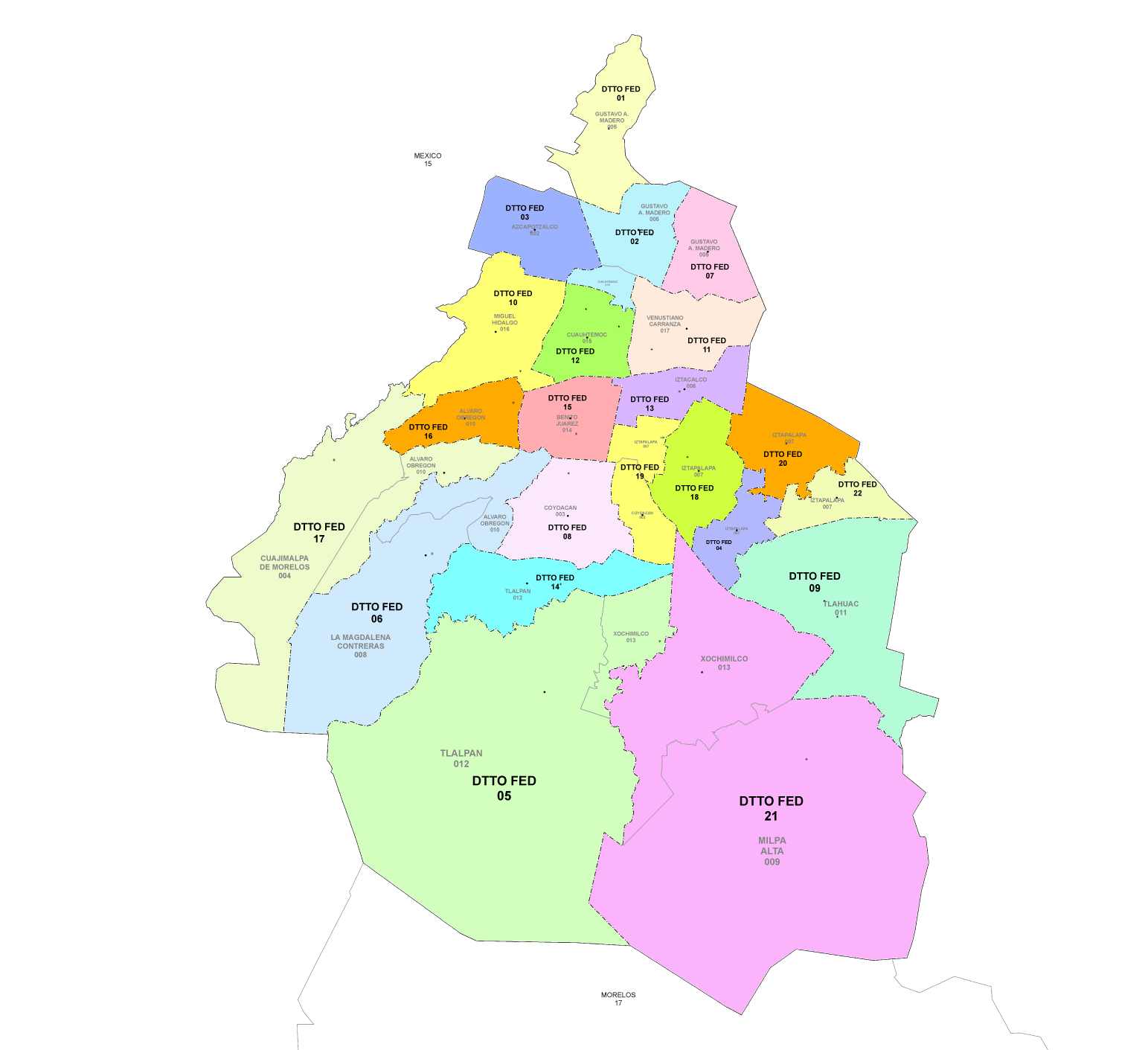
- 7th district since 2023

Incumbent
- Member: Juan Guillermo Rendón Gómez
- Party: ▌Morena
- Congress: 66th (2024–2027)

District
- State: Mexico City
- Head town: Gustavo A. Madero
- Coordinates: 19°28′56″N 99°06′45″W
- Covers: Gustavo A. Madero (part)
- PR region: Fourth
- Precincts: 334
- Population: 433,256 (2020 census)

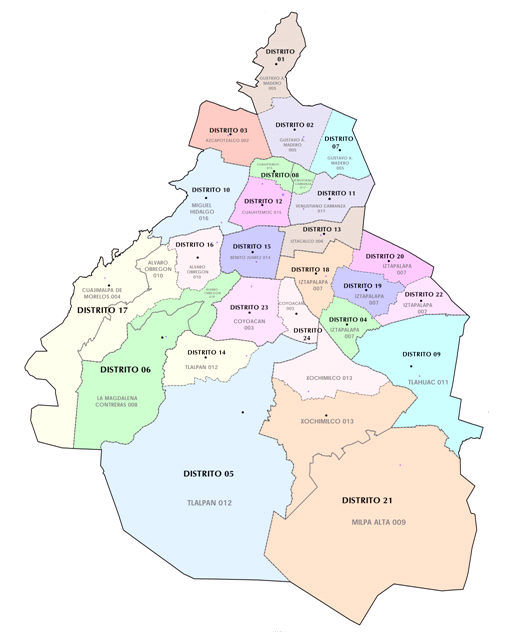
Mexico City under the 2017–2022 districting plan

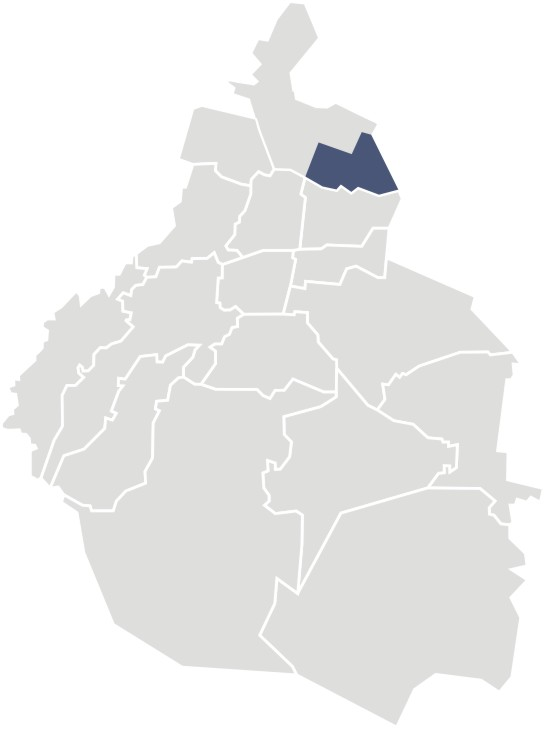
7th district in 2005–2017

The 7th federal electoral district of Mexico City (Spanish: Distrito electoral federal 07 de la Ciudad de México; previously "of the Federal District") is one of the 300 electoral districts into which Mexico is divided for the purpose of elections to the federal Chamber of Deputies and one of 22 such districts in Mexico City.

It elects one deputy to the lower house of Congress for each three-year legislative session by means of the first-past-the-post system. Votes cast in the district also count towards the calculation of proportional representation ("plurinominal") deputies elected from the fourth region.

The current member for the district, elected in the 2024 general election, is Juan Guillermo Rendón Gómez of the National Regeneration Movement (Morena).

== District territory ==
Under the 2023 districting plan adopted by the National Electoral Institute (INE), which is to be used for the 2024, 2027 and 2030 federal elections, the 7th district covers 334 electoral precincts (secciones electorales) across the south-eastern portion of the borough (alcaldía) of Gustavo A. Madero.

The district reported a population of 433,256 in the 2020 census.

== Previous districting schemes ==
Evolution of electoral district numbers
	1974	1978	1996	2005	2017	2023
Mexico City (Federal District)	27	40	30	27	24	22
Chamber of Deputies	196	300				

2017–2022

From 2017 to 2022, the district comprised a portion of Gustavo A. Madero.

2005–2017

Under the 2005 districting scheme, the district covered a south-eastern portion Gustavo A. Madero.

1996–2005

Between 1996 and 2005, the district's territory was similar to its 2005 configuration.

1978–1996

The districting scheme in force from 1978 to 1996 was the result of the 1977 electoral reforms, which increased the number of single-member seats in the Chamber of Deputies from 196 to 300. Under that plan, the Federal District's seat allocation rose from 27 to 40. The 7th district covered portions of the borough of Cuauhtémoc and Benito Juárez.

== Deputies returned to Congress ==
(Mexico) National parties
- Current
- PAN
- PRI
- PT
- PVEM
- MC
- Morena
- PAZ
- Somos
- Defunct or local only
- PLM
- PNR
- PRM
- PNM
- PP
- PPS
- PARM
- PFCRN
- CON
- PANAL
- PSD
- PES
- PES
- PRD

Mexico City's 7th district
Election	Deputy	Party	Term	Legislature
1916	Rafael L. de los Ríos		1916–1917	Constituent Congress of Querétaro
1917	Luis I. Mata		1917–1918	27th Congress
1918	Guillermo S. Cordero	PLN	1918–1920	28th Congress
1920	Ernesto Aguirre Colorado		1920–1922	29th Congress
1922	Antonio Valadéz Ramírez		1922–1924	30th Congress
1924	Miguel Yépez Solórzano		1924–1926	32nd Congress
1926	Genaro V. Vásquez		1926–1928	32nd Congress
1928	Alfonso Romandía Ferreira	PO	1928–1930	33rd Congress
1930	Cosme Mier Riva-Palacio	Institutional Revolutionary Party	1930–1932	34th Congress
1932	Samuel Villarreal Jr.	Institutional Revolutionary Party	1932–1934	35th Congress
1934	José María Oceguera	Institutional Revolutionary Party	1934–1937	36th Congress
1937	Fernando Amilpa	Institutional Revolutionary Party	1937–1940	37th Congress
1940	Alejandro Carrillo Marcor	Institutional Revolutionary Party	1940–1943	38th Congress
1943	Pedro Téllez Vargas	Institutional Revolutionary Party	1943–1945	39th Congress
	Francisco Mallorca	Institutional Revolutionary Party	1945–1946	39th Congress
1946	Juan Gutiérrez Lascuráin	National Action Party (Mexico)	1946–1949	40th Congress
1949	Vacant		1949–1952	42nd Congress
1952	Mariano Ardonica Burgos	Institutional Revolutionary Party	1952–1955	42nd Congress
1955	Ricardo Velázquez Vázquez	Institutional Revolutionary Party	1955–1958	43rd Congress
1958	Manuel Moreno Cárdenas	Institutional Revolutionary Party	1958–1961	44th Congress
1961	Guillermo Solórzano Gutiérrez	Institutional Revolutionary Party	1961–1964	45th Congress
1964	Carlos Sánchez Dosal	Institutional Revolutionary Party	1964–1967	46th Congress
1967	Jorge Durán Chávez	Institutional Revolutionary Party	1967–1970	47th Congress
1970	Jaime Fernández Reyes	Institutional Revolutionary Party	1970–1973	48th Congress
1973	Jorge Durán Chávez	Institutional Revolutionary Party	1973–1976	49th Congress
1976	María Elena Marqués	Institutional Revolutionary Party	1976–1979	50th Congress
1979	David Reynoso	Institutional Revolutionary Party	1979–1982	52nd Congress
1982	José de Jesús Fernández Alatorre	Institutional Revolutionary Party	1982–1985	52nd Congress
1985	Javier Garduño Pérez	Institutional Revolutionary Party	1985–1988	53rd Congress
1988	José Antonio Fernández Sánchez	National Action Party (Mexico)	1988–1991	54th Congress
1991	Julio Alemán	Institutional Revolutionary Party	1991–1994	55th Congress
1994	Jorge Efraín Moreno Collado	Institutional Revolutionary Party	1994–1997	56th Congress
1997	Aarón Quiroz Jiménez	Party of the Democratic Revolution	1997–2000	57th Congress
2000	Mario Reyes Oviedo	National Action Party (Mexico)	2000–2003	58th Congress
2003	Iván García Solís	Party of the Democratic Revolution	2003–2006	59th Congress
2006	Juan N. Guerra	Party of the Democratic Revolution	2006–2009	60th Congress
2009	Nazario Norberto Sánchez	Party of the Democratic Revolution	2009–2012	61st Congress
2012	Claudia Elena Águila Torres	Party of the Democratic Revolution	2012–2015	62nd Congress
2015	María Chávez García	National Regeneration Movement	2015–2018	63rd Congress
2018	Beatriz Rojas Martínez	National Regeneration Movement	2018–2021	64th Congress
2021	Beatriz Rojas Martínez	National Regeneration Movement	2021–2024	65th Congress
2024	Juan Guillermo Rendón Gómez	National Regeneration Movement	2024–2027	66th Congress

== Presidential elections ==
Mexico City's 7th district
Election	District won by	Party or coalition	%
2018	Andrés Manuel López Obrador	Juntos Haremos Historia	61.0839
2024	Claudia Sheinbaum Pardo	Sigamos Haciendo Historia	59.0013
