= Sistema Educativo Justo Sierra =

School and university system in Mexico City

Sistema Educativo Justo Sierra is a private school and university system in the Mexico City metropolitan area. Universidad Justo Sierra is a part of the system.

Its campuses include:

- Plantel Acueducto (Laguna Ticomán, Gustavo A. Madero) - Middle school, high school, and university
- Plantel Aragón (San Juan de Aragón, Gustavo A. Madero) - One middle school campus and one high school campus
- Plantel Azahares (Santa María Insurgentes, Cuauhtémoc) - High school
- Plantel Insurgentes (Lindavista, Gustavo A. Madero) - High school
- Plantel Jacarandas - One middle school campus and one high school campus
- Plantel Bachillerato Tecnológico - Bachillerato (high school diploma)
- Plantel Jardín - Kindergarten and primary school
- Plantel Cien Metros - University
- Plantel San Mateo (Naucalpan, State of Mexico) - Middle school, high school, and university
- Plantel Ticomán - University
