= San Felipe de Jesús Tianguis =

Market in Mexico City

The San Felipe de Jesús Tianguis (locally known as La San Felipe and La San Fe) takes place on Sundays in the neighborhood of the same name in Gustavo A. Madero, Mexico City. It is Latin America's largest tianguis or street market, with 30,000 vendors and stretching 7 kilometers.
