= Nazario Norberto Sánchez =

Mexican politician

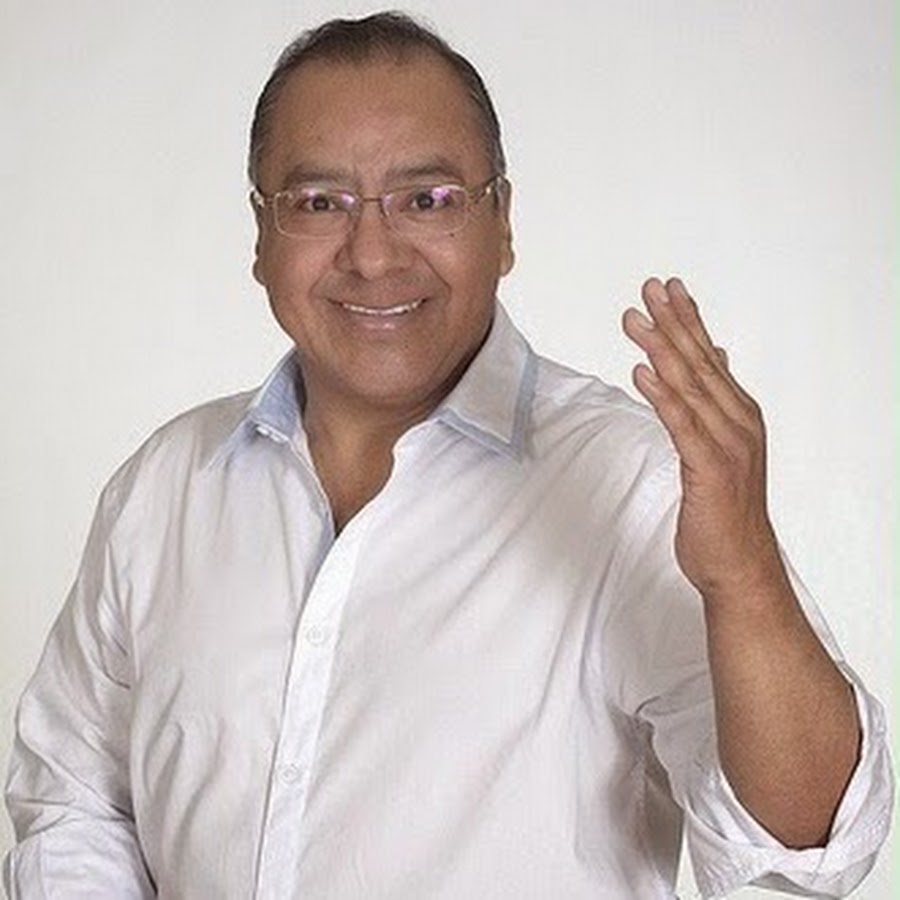
- Born: 12 June 1956 (age 69); Mexico City, Mexico
- Occupation: Politician
- Political party: PRI

Nazario Norberto Sánchez (born 12 June 1956) is a Mexican politician from the Institutional Revolutionary Party. From 2009 to 2012 he served as a federal deputy in the 61st Congress, representing the Federal District's seventh district for the PRI.
