= Iván García Solís =

Mexican politician

- Born: 19 June 1936 (age 89); Mexico City, Mexico
- Occupation: Politician
- Political party: PCM (1960–1981); PSUM (1981–1987); PMS (1987–1989); PRD (1989–present)

Iván García Solís (Note: In this Mexican name, the surname is García and the second or maternal family name is Solís.) (born 19 June 1936) is a Mexican politician. As an elected official, he has represented both the Unified Socialist Party of Mexico (PSUM) and the Party of the Democratic Revolution (PRD) in the Congress of the Union.

García Solís was born in Mexico City. He joined the Mexican Communist Party (PCM) in 1960 and was a founding member of the Unified Socialist Party of Mexico (PSUM) in 1981, of the Mexican Socialist Party (PMS) in 1987, and of the Party of the Democratic Revolution (PRD) in 1989.

His first congressional term was in 1982–1985 (52nd Congress), when he was elected to the Chamber of Deputies as a proportional-representation deputy for the PSUM. In the 2003 mid-terms, he was re-elected to Congress, to represent the Federal District's 7th district for the PRD during the 59th Congress.

Additionally, from 1994 to 1997 he sat as a deputy in the first session of the Legislative Assembly of the Federal District (ALDF) and was the borough chief of Venustiano Carranza in 1999–2000.
