= Escuela Cristóbal Colón de la Salle =

Private school with three campuses in Gustavo A. Madero, Mexico City

Location
- Gustavo A. Madero, Mexico City; Mexico

Information
- Website: https://ecc.edu.mx/

Escuela Cristóbal Colón de la Salle is a private school with three campuses in Gustavo A. Madero, Mexico City. It has one preschool campus and one elementary school campus in Col. Tepeyac Insurgentes, and a middle and high school campus in Col. Siete Maravillas.
