= Universidad Justo Sierra =

Coordinates: 18°54′.18″N 99°10′30.48″W

Justo Sierra University
- Motto: Ad Vitam Estudere
- Type: Private
- Established: 7 March 1994
- Founders: José Reyes Oliva (JRO)
- Location: Av. Acueducto, N. 914, La laguna Ticoman., Mexico City, Mexico
- Colors: Blue, red and white
- Mascot: Bear
- Website: www.universidad-justosierra.edu.mx

Justo Sierra University, popularly known as El justo is a private university located in Mexico City. It is a part of the Sistema Educativo Justo Sierra.

It was founded by Prof. José Leopoldo Enrique Reyes Oliva (JRO) in 1991 in honor of Justo Sierra. It is located in many places in the metropolitan area, serving students from different states and countries.

== Organization ==
The university has academic departments instead of faculties and offers undergraduate and graduate studies.

== Campuses ==
Justo Sierra University includes multiple campuses:

- San Mateo
- Ticoman
- Acueducto
- Cien Metros
