= Gustavo A. Madero, Mexico City =

Gustavo A. Madero
- Borough
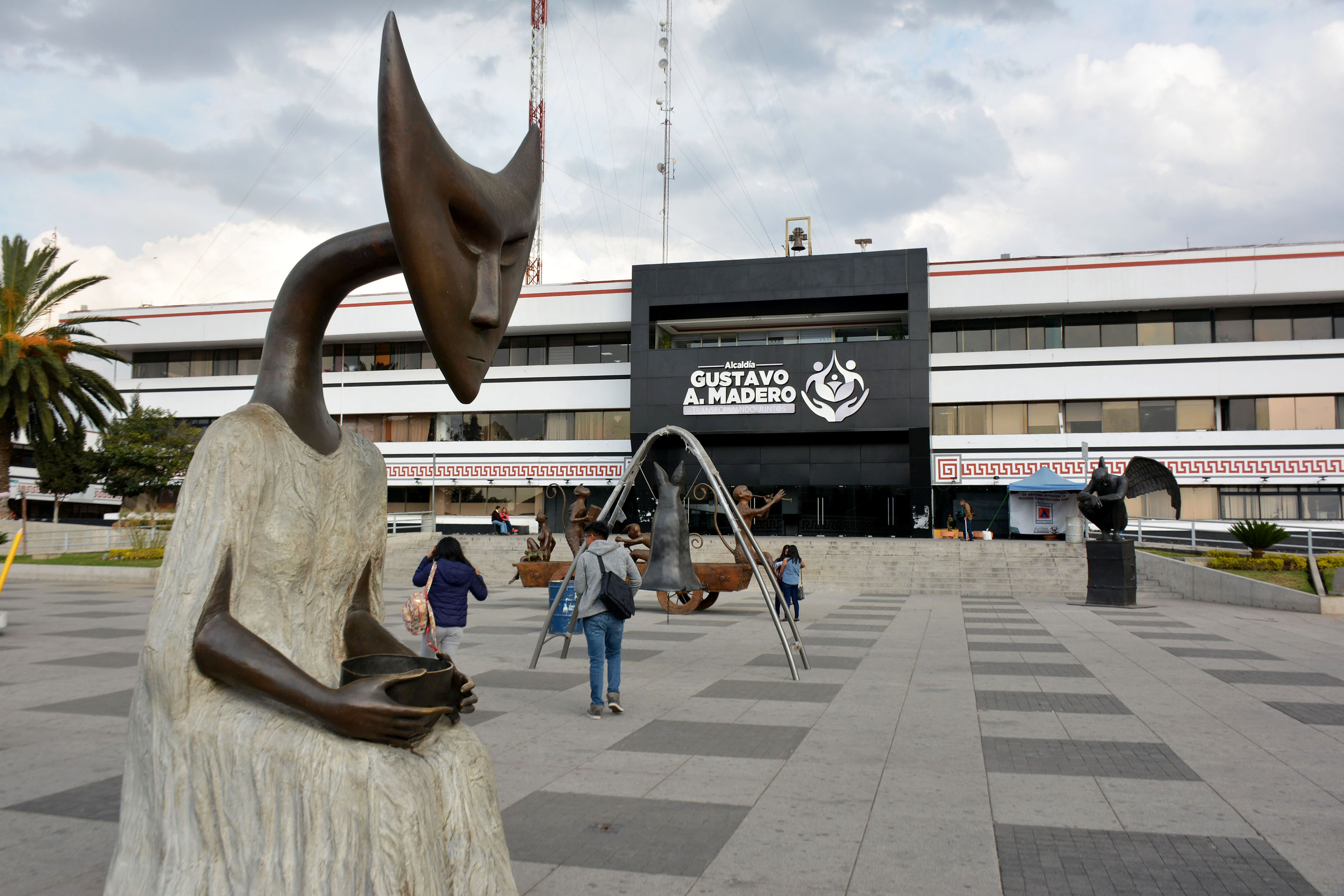
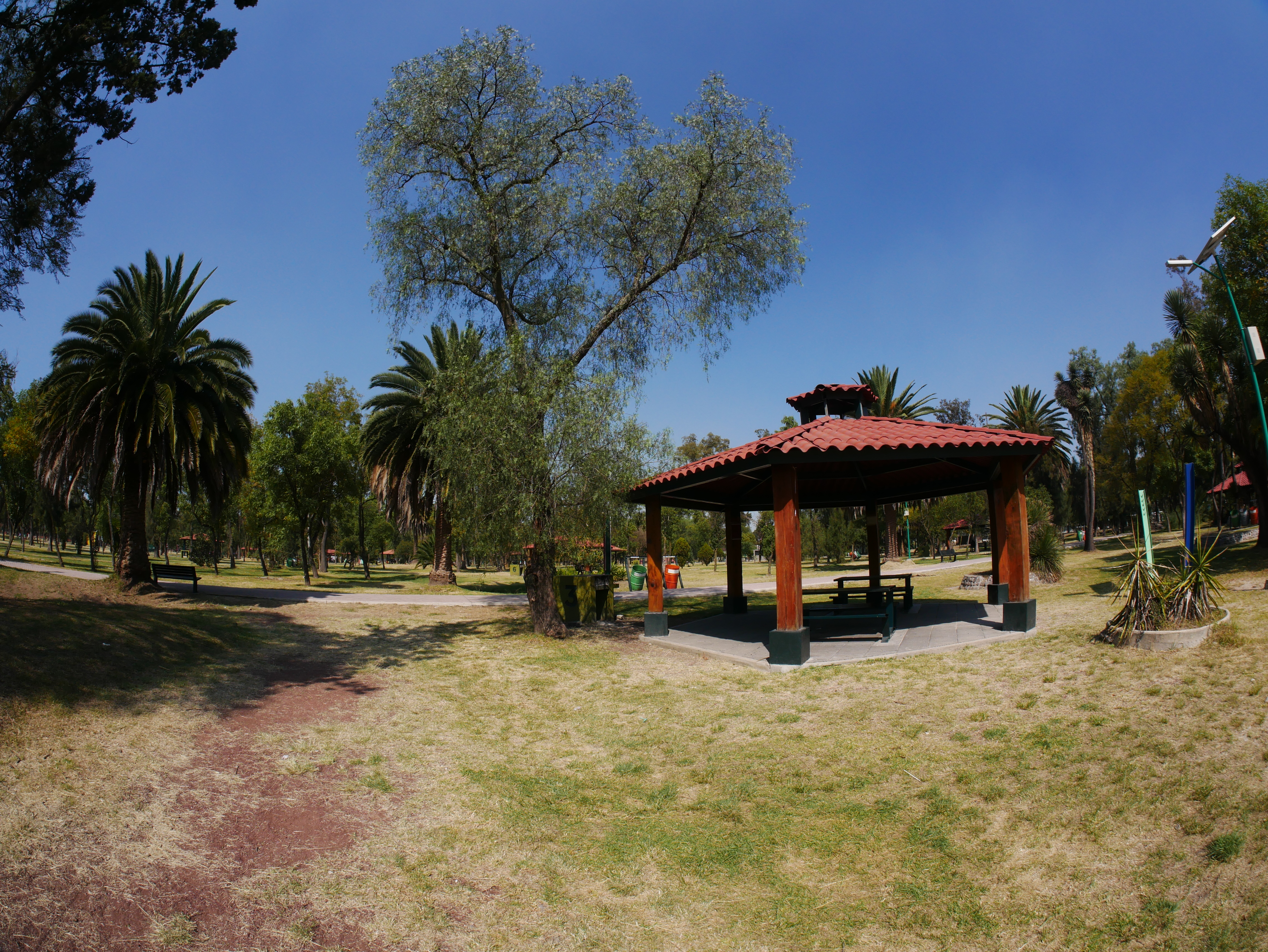
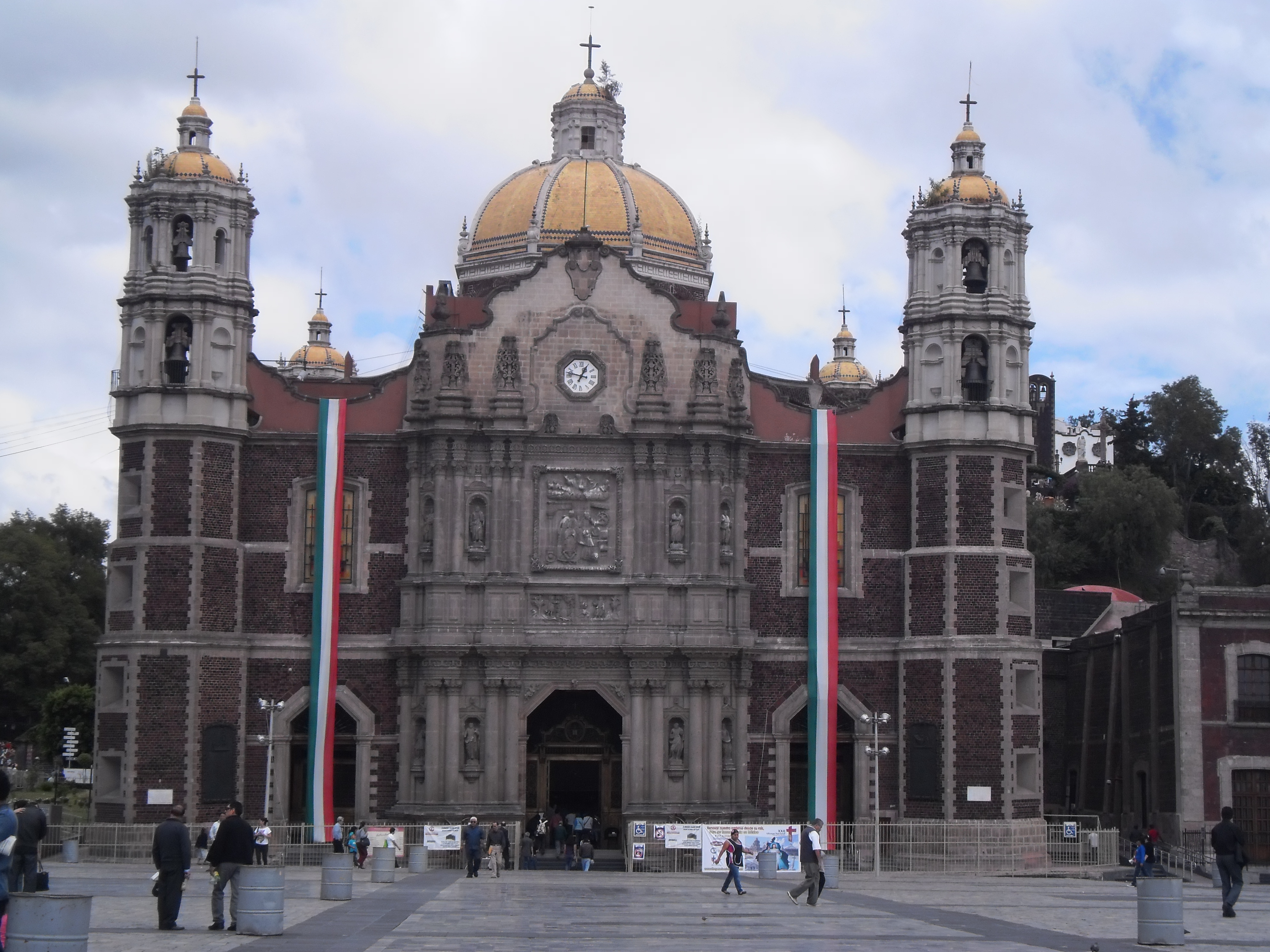
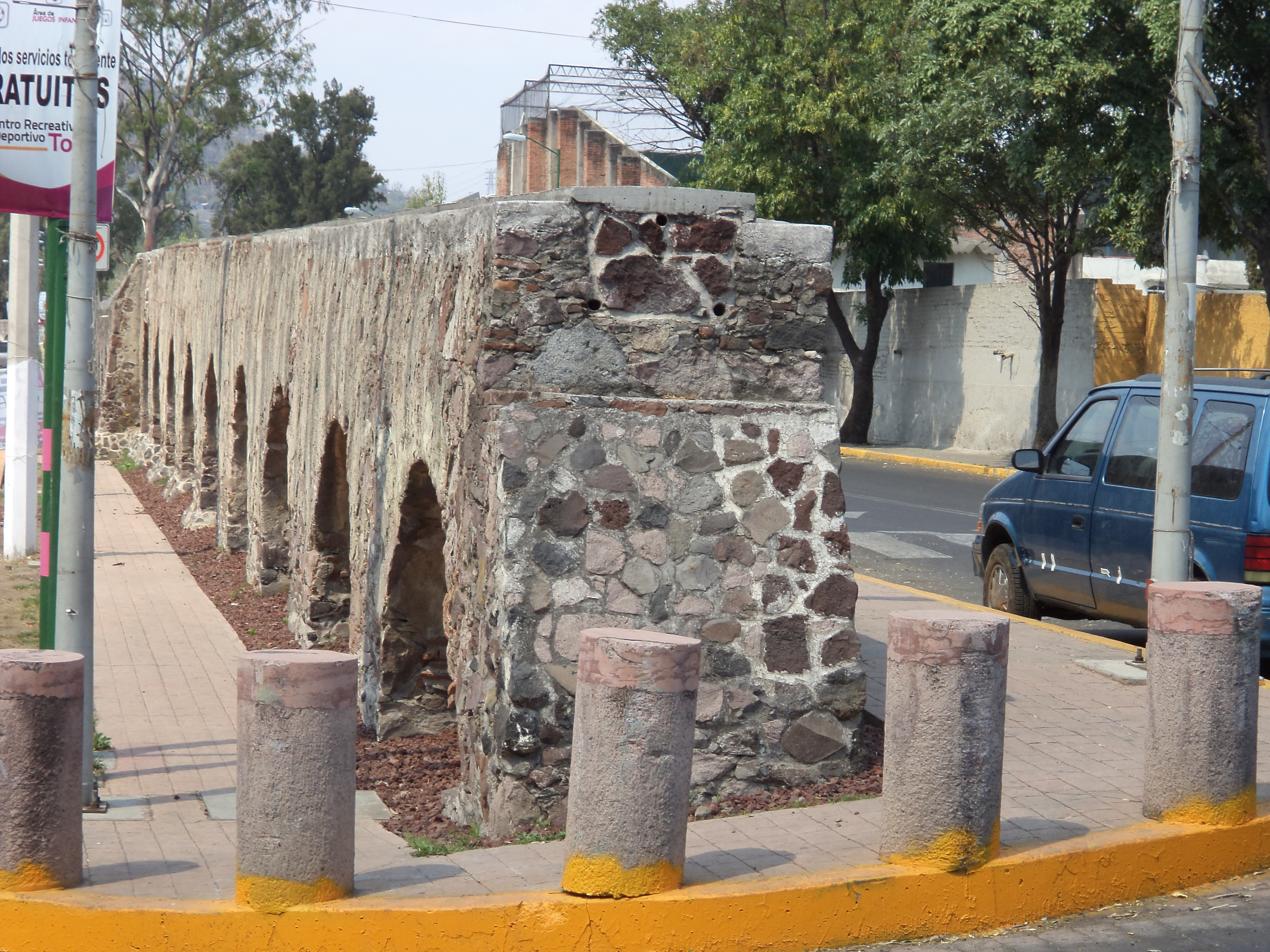
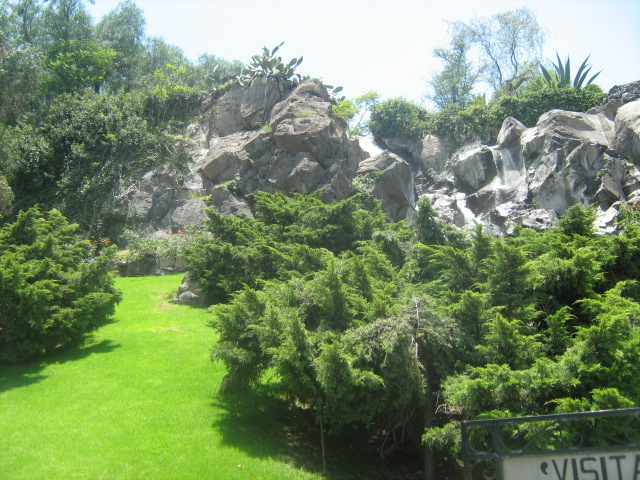
- Top: Gustavo A. Madero Borough Hall; Middle: Aragón Forest, Old Sanctuary of the Virgin of Guadalupe; Bottom: Guadalupe Aqueduct; Tepeyac Hill gardens

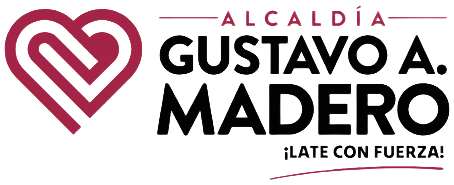
- Seal Logo

- Gustavo A. Madero within Mexico City
- Coordinates: 19°28′56″N 99°06′45″W
- Country: Mexico
- Federal entity: Mexico City
- Established: 1928
- Named for: Gustavo A. Madero
- Seat: 5 de Febrero esq. Vicente Villada, Col. Villa

Government
  - Mayor: Janecarlo Lozano Reynoso (MORENA)
  - Federal electoral districts: CDMX-01, CDMX-02 & CDMX-07

Area
  - Total: 88.36 km^{2} (34.12 sq mi)
- Elevation: 2,243 m (7,359 ft)

Population (2020).
  - Total: 1,173,351
  - Density: 13,280/km^{2} (34,390/sq mi)
- Time zone: UTC-6 (Zona Centro)
- Postal codes: 07000 – 07990
- Area code: 55
- HDI (2020): ▲0.816 Very High
- Website: gamadero.cdmx.gob.mx

Gustavo A. Madero is the northernmost borough (demarcación territorial) of Mexico City.

== History ==
Founded as "Villa de Guadalupe" in 1563, it became the city of "Villa de Guadalupe Hidalgo" in 1828, and finally a delegación in 1931. It was named after Gustavo A. Madero, the brother and fellow revolutionary of President Francisco I. Madero.

The Treaty of Guadalupe Hidalgo, which ended the Mexican–American War of 1846–1848, was signed in Gustavo A. Madero.

== Points of interest ==
The area houses the Basílica de Guadalupe, the shrine of Our Lady of Guadalupe at the foot of Tepeyac Hill, where Roman Catholics believe the Virgin Mary appeared to the indigenous Mexican Juan Diego Cuauhtlatoatzin in 1531.

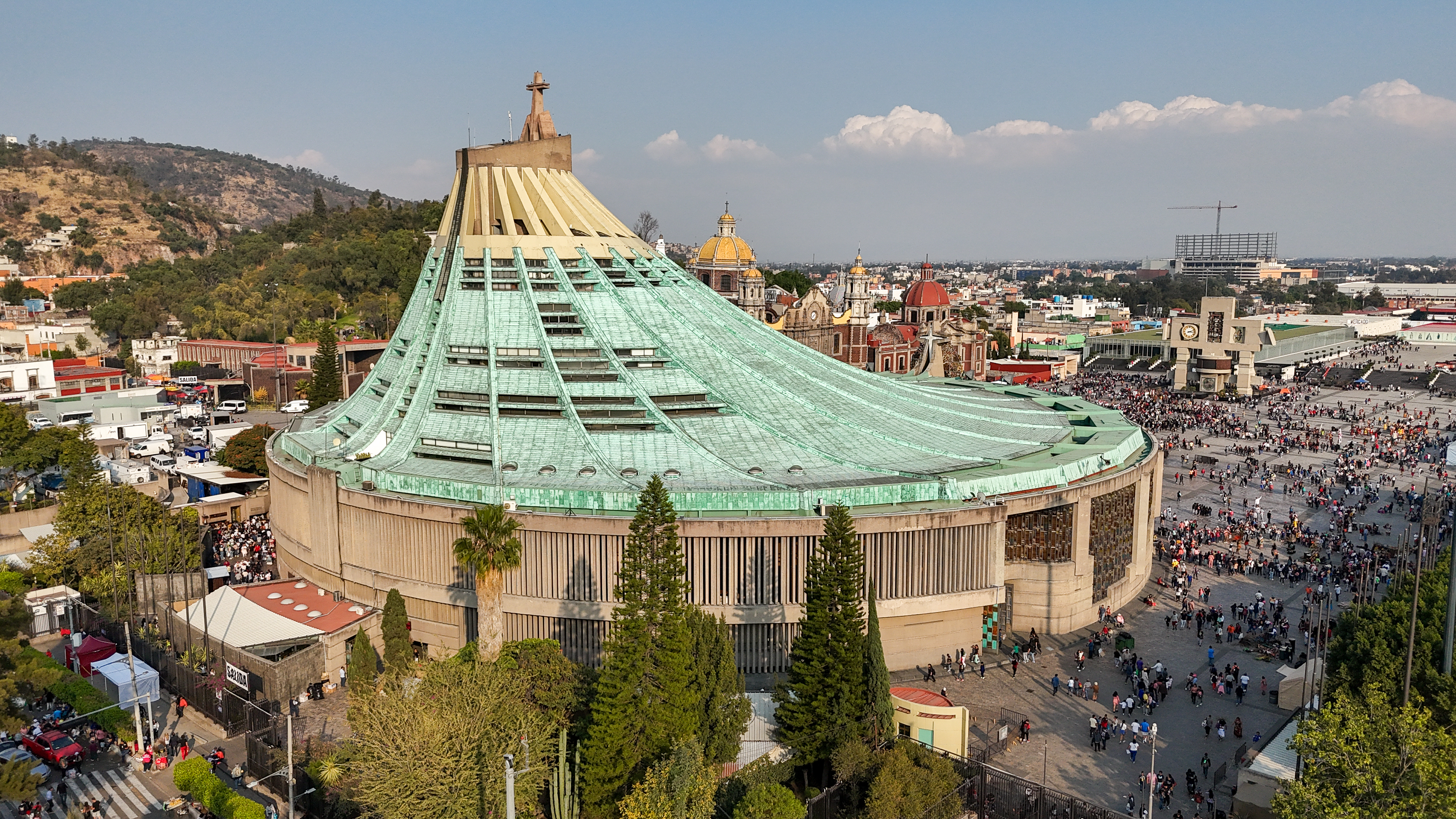
Basílica de Guadalupe in 2024

Being the northernmost borough, the Northern Central Bus Station (Terminal Central del Norte) is located here, providing constant bus service to all major cities in the northern and western part of the country.

On Sundays, the San Felipe de Jesús Tianguis in the neighborhood of the same name, is Latin America's largest tianguis or street market, with 30,000 vendors and stretching seven kilometers.

== Education ==
Public high schools of the Instituto de Educación Media Superior del Distrito Federal (IEMS) include:

- Escuela Preparatoria Gustavo A. Madero I "Belisario Domínguez"
- Escuela Preparatoria Gustavo A. Madero II "Salvador Allende"

Private schools:

- Multiple campuses of the Sistema Educativo Justo Sierra: Acueducto (Laguna Ticomán), Aragón (San Juan de Aragón), and Insurgentes (Lindavista)
- Colegio Guadalupe in Lindavista
- Escuela Cristóbal Colón de la Salle (three campuses)
- Instituto Ovalle Monday S. C. (preschool through junior high school, including elementary schools in Lindavista)

== Climate ==
Climate data for Gustavo A. Madero, D.F. (1991–2020)
Month	Jan	Feb	Mar	Apr	May	Jun	Jul	Aug	Sep	Oct	Nov	Dec	Year
Record high °C (°F)	37.0 (98.6)	35.0 (95.0)	38.5 (101.3)	38.0 (100.4)	38.0 (100.4)	38.0 (100.4)	33.0 (91.4)	35.0 (95.0)	31.0 (87.8)	32.0 (89.6)	31.0 (87.8)	29.0 (84.2)	38.5 (101.3)
Mean daily maximum °C (°F)	22.0 (71.6)	24.3 (75.7)	26.3 (79.3)	27.7 (81.9)	27.7 (81.9)	25.8 (78.4)	24.5 (76.1)	24.4 (75.9)	23.8 (74.8)	23.2 (73.8)	22.4 (72.3)	21.8 (71.2)	24.5 (76.1)
Daily mean °C (°F)	13.4 (56.1)	15.2 (59.4)	17.1 (62.8)	19.0 (66.2)	19.5 (67.1)	18.9 (66.0)	17.9 (64.2)	17.9 (64.2)	17.6 (63.7)	16.4 (61.5)	14.8 (58.6)	13.6 (56.5)	16.8 (62.2)
Mean daily minimum °C (°F)	4.8 (40.6)	6.2 (43.2)	8.0 (46.4)	10.3 (50.5)	11.4 (52.5)	12.1 (53.8)	11.4 (52.5)	11.5 (52.7)	11.4 (52.5)	9.5 (49.1)	7.1 (44.8)	5.3 (41.5)	9.1 (48.4)
Record low °C (°F)	−7.5 (18.5)	−5.0 (23.0)	−3.0 (26.6)	−1.0 (30.2)	0.9 (33.6)	5.5 (41.9)	1.5 (34.7)	1.0 (33.8)	0.0 (32.0)	−5.0 (23.0)	−6.5 (20.3)	−6.0 (21.2)	−7.5 (18.5)
Average precipitation mm (inches)	5.1 (0.20)	7.0 (0.28)	14.5 (0.57)	29.1 (1.15)	44.8 (1.76)	123.6 (4.87)	141.3 (5.56)	127.7 (5.03)	107.2 (4.22)	59.3 (2.33)	17.0 (0.67)	5.5 (0.22)	682.1 (26.85)
Average precipitation days (≥ 0.1 mm)	1.7	2.1	4.5	7.1	9.9	14.8	18.5	18.6	15.4	8.5	3.4	1.2	105.7
Source: Servicio Meteorológico National

== Notable people ==
- Julio César Jasso Ramírez, perpetrator in the 2026 Teotihuacan pyramids shooting
