= Rosario Castellanos National University =

Public university in Mexico

National Rosario Castellanos University
- Universidad Nacional Rosario Castellanos
- Former names: Rosario Castellanos Institute of Higher Studies of Mexico City (2019–2023); Rosario Castellanos University (2023–2024)
- Type: Public
- Established: 23 May 2019 (as a deconcentrated body); 2 December 2024 (as a national university)
- Rector: Alma Xóchitl Herrera Márquez
- Location: Avenida 506, Colonia San Juan de Aragón II Sección, Gustavo A. Madero, Mexico City, Mexico
- Website: rcastellanos.cdmx.gob.mx

The Rosario Castellanos National University (Spanish: Universidad Nacional Rosario Castellanos, UNRC), formerly the Rosario Castellanos Institute of Higher Studies of Mexico City and the Rosario Castellanos University (URC), is a public university in Mexico offering tuition-free higher education. It operates a network of campuses across Mexico City and, since 2024, several other Mexican states.

The UNRC is named for the poet and diplomat Rosario Castellanos (1925–1974).

== History ==
The university's immediate predecessor opened its first campus in Mexico City's Gustavo A. Madero borough in September 2017 as a pilot program called the Centro de Estudios Superiores (Center for Higher Studies), launched under then-head of government Miguel Ángel Mancera.

On 23 May 2019, Mexico City head of government Claudia Sheinbaum issued a decree formally establishing the pilot program as the Rosario CastellanosInstitute of Higher Studies of Mexico City, a deconcentrated body under the city's Secretariat of Education, Science, Technology and Innovation. Alma Xóchitl Herrera Márquez, who had helped design the institution's academic model, was appointed its first rector in 2020.

On 25 May 2023, the Congress of Mexico City approved reforms to the city's education law granting the institute university status, formally reconstituting it as the Rosario Castellanos University.

On 2 December 2024, President Claudia Sheinbaum signed a federal decree converting the institution into the Rosario Castellanos National University, a decentralized body of the federal public administration under the National Council of Humanities, Science and Technology (CONAHCYT). The move extended the university beyond Mexico City, with its first campus outside the capital opening in Comitán de Domínguez, Chiapas, Castellanos's birthplace.

== Campuses ==
The UNRC operates campuses across multiple Mexico City boroughs, including Azcapotzalco, Coyoacán, Cuauhtémoc, La Magdalena Contreras, Miguel Hidalgo, Milpa Alta, Tlalpan, and Gustavo A. Madero. Since 2025, the university has expanded to additional states, including Baja California (Tijuana, Mexicali), Chiapas (Comitán de Domínguez), Oaxaca, Guerrero, Nayarit, Sonora, Hidalgo, the State of Mexico, and Quintana Roo.

In October 2026, Sheinbaum announced that a campus of the UNRC would be opened in the confiscated estate of former Mexico City police chief Arturo Durazo in San Andrés Totoltepec, Tlalpan.

== Courses ==
The UNRC offers undergraduate and graduate programs in both in-person and distance-learning formats, including bachelor's degrees, specializations, master's degrees, and doctorates.
