= British American School =

British American School may refer to:

- British American School, a private, all-grades school offering a bilingual education in Puerto Vallarta, Jalisco, Mexico
- British American School (State of Mexico), a private international school in Naucalpan, part of Greater Mexico City
- British International School of Charlotte, a private, non-sectarian, co-ed college prep school located in Charlotte, North Carolina
