= Tlalpan Delegation Central Library =

Library in Mexico City, Mexico

- Biblioteca Central Delegacional de Tlalpan
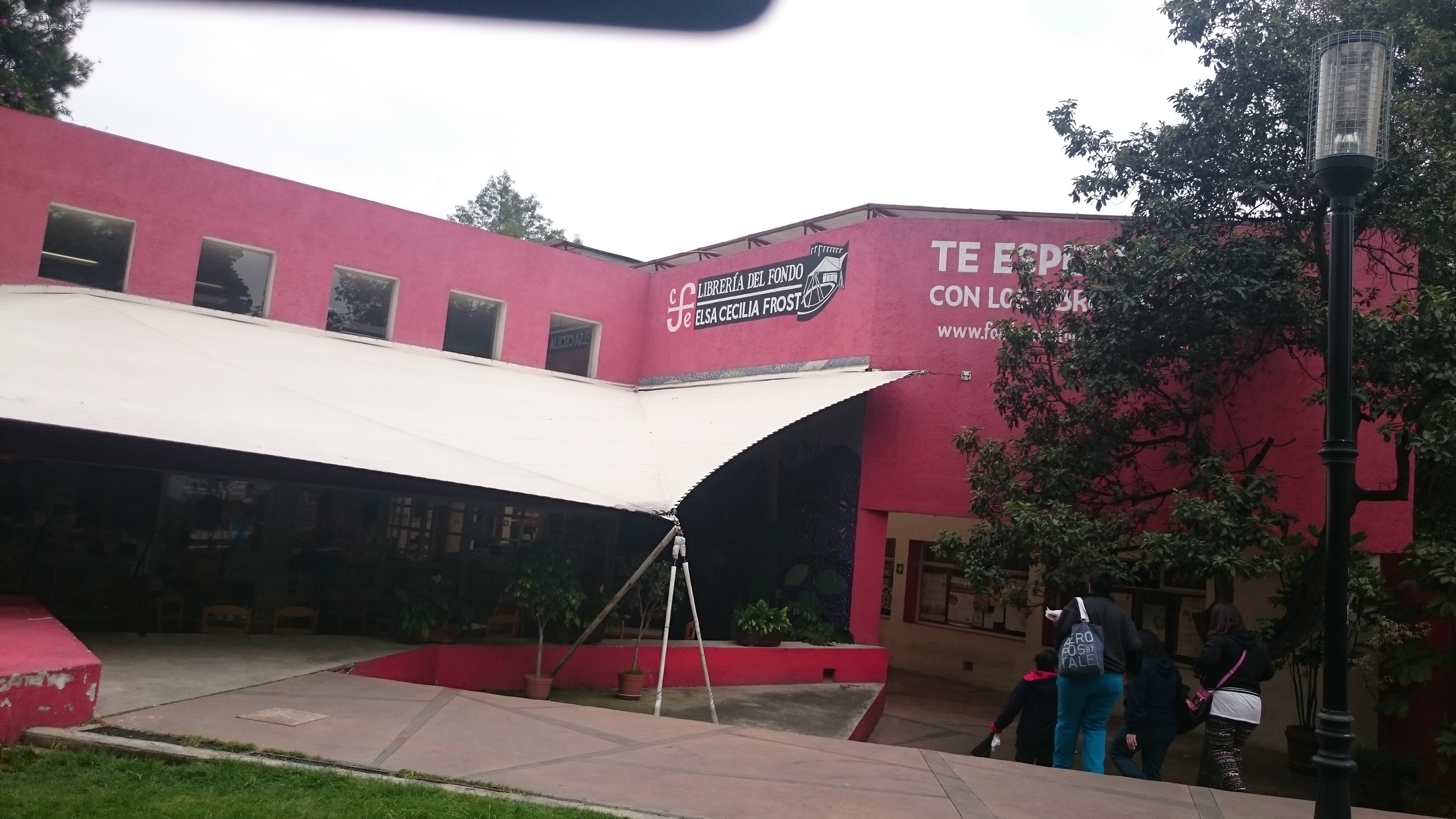
- 19.290763°N 99.166641°W
- Location: Tlalpan, Mexico City, Mexico
- Type: Public library

The Tlalpan Delegation Central Library (Spanish: Biblioteca Central Delegacional de Tlalpan) is a public library located in the south of Mexico City on Allende Street No. 418, between Benito Juárez and Francisco I. Madero, in the borough of Tlalpan.

== History ==
According to the Library and Information Services Map of Mexico City, the former Luis Cabrera Library (now called the Tlalpan Delegation Central Library) was founded in 1975.
