= Boroughs of Mexico City =

Administrative divisions of Mexico City

Borough demarcación territorial (Spanish)
- Also known as: alcaldía (Spanish), delegación (Spanish)
- Mexico City boroughs
- Category: Borough / City district
- Location: Mexico
- Found in: Mexico City
- Number: 16 (as of July 2025)
- Populations: Smallest: 152,685 (Milpa Alta); Largest: 1,835,486 (Iztapalapa)
- Areas: Smallest: 23.1 km^{2} (8.9 sq mi) (Iztacalco); Largest: 314.5 km^{2} (121.4 sq mi) (Tlalpan)
- Government: Borough mayor (Alcalde)
- Subdivisions: Neighborhoods

Boroughs (Spanish: demarcaciones territoriales, lit. 'territorial demarcations') are the subdivisions of Mexico City, the capital city and a federative entity of Mexico. As of 2026, there are 16 boroughs in Mexico City. Each borough is headed by a borough mayor (alcalde), which makes it colloquially known as alcaldía. The traditional center of Mexico City comprises four boroughs: Benito Juárez, Cuauhtémoc, Miguel Hidalgo, and Venustiano Carranza.

Mexico City is one of the 32 federal entities of Mexico, with the others being the 31 states. It was named Distrito Federal (Federal District) until February 5, 2016, when it was officially renamed the Ciudad de México. According to the 2020 census, it is the second most populated entity with 9,209,944 inhabitants and the smallest by land area, spanning 1,494.3 square kilometres (577.0 sq mi).

Map of Mexico with Mexico City highlighted

Despite containing the word "city", it is not governed as a city but as a unit consisting of multiple subdivisions. As a result of the political reforms enacted in 2016, it is no longer designated as a federal district and became a city, a member entity of the Mexican federation, the seat of the Powers of the Union, and the capital of Mexico. Thus, Mexico City is not organized into municipalities.

The largest borough by population is Iztapalapa, with 1,835,486 residents, while the smallest is Milpa Alta, with 152,685 residents. Iztacalco is the most densely populated subdivision in Mexico. The largest borough by land area is Tlalpan, which spans 314.50 km^{2} (121.43 sq mi), and the smallest is Iztacalco, with 23.10 km^{2} (8.92 sq mi).

The most recent boroughs are Benito Juárez, Cuauhtémoc, Miguel Hidalgo, and Venustiano Carranza, all established in 1970 out of the former circumscription of Mexico City.

== Boroughs ==
Name	Seal	Population (2020)	Population (2010)	Change	Land area		Population density (2020)	Incorporation date
Name	Seal	Population (2020)	Population (2010)	Change	km^{2}	sq mi	Population density (2020)	Incorporation date
Álvaro Obregón (Note: Álvaro Obregón was originally incorporated as San Ángel, changing its name on 31 December 1941.)		759,137	727,034	+4.4%	95.9	37.0	7,915.9/km^{2} (20,502.1/sq mi)	15 February 1826
Azcapotzalco		432,205	414,711	+4.2%	33.5	12.9	12,901.6/km^{2} (33,415.1/sq mi)	6 August 1826
Benito Juárez		434,153	385,439	+12.6%	26.7	10.3	16,260.4/km^{2} (42,114.3/sq mi)	29 December 1970
Coyoacán		614,447	620,416	−1.0%	53.9	20.8	11,399.8/km^{2} (29,525.2/sq mi)	6 August 1824
Cuajimalpa		217,686	186,391	+16.8%	71.2	27.5	3,057.4/km^{2} (7,918.6/sq mi)	28 July 1899
Cuauhtémoc		545,884	531,831	+2.6%	32.5	12.5	16,796.4/km^{2} (43,502.6/sq mi)	29 December 1970
Gustavo A. Madero (Note: Gustavo A. Madero was originally incorporated as Guadalupe Hidalgo, changing its name on 31 December 1941.)		1,173,351	1,185,772	−1.0%	87.9	33.9	13,348.7/km^{2} (34,573.0/sq mi)	8 May 1861
Iztacalco (Note: Iztacalco was merged with Gustavo A. Madero (at that time known as Guadalupe Hidalgo) from 1903 to 1921.)		404,695	384,326	+5.3%	23.1	8.9	17,519.3/km^{2} (45,374.7/sq mi)	5 March 1862
Iztapalapa		1,835,486	1,815,786	+1.1%	113.2	43.7	16,214.5/km^{2} (41,995.5/sq mi)	5 March 1862
La Magdalena Contreras		247,622	239,086	+3.6%	63.4	24.5	3,905.7/km^{2} (10,115.7/sq mi)	31 December 1928
Miguel Hidalgo		414,470	372,889	+11.2%	46.4	17.9	8,932.5/km^{2} (23,135.2/sq mi)	29 December 1970
Milpa Alta		152,685	130,582	+16.9%	298.2	115.1	512.0/km^{2} (1,326.1/sq mi)	15 December 1826
Tláhuac (Note: Tláhuac was merged with Xochimilco from 1903 to 1928.)		392,313	360,265	+8.9%	85.9	33.2	4,567.1/km^{2} (11,828.7/sq mi)	15 February 1826
Tlalpan (Note: Tlalpan was originally incorporated as San Agustín de las Cuevas, changing its name on 25 September 1827.)		699,928	650,567	+7.6%	314.5	121.4	2,225.5/km^{2} (5,764.1/sq mi)	8 April 1825
Venustiano Carranza		443,704	430,978	+3.0%	32.5	12.5	13,652.4/km^{2} (35,359.6/sq mi)	29 December 1970
Xochimilco		442,178	415,007	+6.5%	114.1	44.1	3,875.4/km^{2} (10,037.1/sq mi)	6 August 1826
Mexico City	—	9,209,944	8,851,080	+4.1%	1,494.3	577.0	6,163.4/km^{2} (15,963.1/sq mi)	—
Mexico	—	126,014,024	112,336,538	+12.2%	1,960,646.7	757,010	64.3/km^{2} (166.5/sq mi)	—

=== Mayors ===
Borough	Mayor	Since
Álvaro Obregón	Javier López Casarín	2024
Azcapotzalco	Nancy Marlene Núñez Reséndiz	2024
Benito Juárez	Luis Mendoza Acevedo	2024
Coyoacán	Giovani Gutiérrez Aguilar	2021
Cuajimalpa	Carlos Orvañanos Rea	2024
Cuauhtémoc	Alessandra Rojo de la Vega	2024
Gustavo A. Madero	Janecarlo Lozano Reynoso	2024
Iztacalco	Lourdes Paz Reyes	2024
Iztapalapa	Aleida Alavez Ruiz	2024
La Magdalena Contreras	Fernando Mercado Guaida	2024
Miguel Hidalgo	Mauricio Tabe Echartea	2021
Milpa Alta	Octavio Rivero Villaseñor	2024
Tláhuac	Berenice Hernández Calderón	2021
Tlalpan	Gabriela Osorio	2024
Venustiano Carranza	Evelyn Parra Álvarez	2021
Xochimilco	Circe Camacho Bastida	2024
