= La Escuela de Lancaster =

Private school in Mexico City

- Tlalpan, Mexico City; Mexico

Information
- School type: Private All-Through School

La Escuela de Lancaster A.C. is a private school in Tlalpan, Mexico City. Its two campuses Plantel Diligencias in Colonia San Pedro Mártir, and Plantel Rey Yupanqui in Colonia Tlalcoligia, house middle through high school, and preschool through elementary school, respectively.
