= Isaías Juárez =

Isaías Juárez (1885–1967) was a leader in the Church of Jesus Christ of Latter-day Saints (LDS Church) in Mexico, an agriculturalist and a local judge and political leader in San Pedro Mártir.

Juarez was born to a poor family was born in San Pedro Martir, not far from Mexico City. He had little education and was often called a "campesino" by those who opposed his policies. In 1907, he and his wife Magdalena were baptized into the LDS Church.

When the North American missionaries left central Mexico due to the outbreak of the Mexican Revolution of 1910, Juarez became the president of the San Pedro Martir Branch. He served as branch president continuously until 1926.

Shortly after the outbreak of the Cristero Rebellion in 1926 caused the Mexican government to exile all foreign clerics, Juarez was called as president of the Mexico District, which covered Mexico City and its environs. In this position, Juarez worked to urge the Mexican members to not hold the Third Convention, especially in light of Anthony W. Ivins's counsel against the first and second conventions as not the proper method to address grievances within the church.

Some sources even list Juarez as the president of the LDS Church's Mexican Mission in the late 1920s. Technically Rey L. Pratt was the mission president, but since he was banned from permanent residence in Mexico, Juarez ran the operations of the LDS Church in that country, at least outside of Chihuahua. The Mormon colonies in Mexico were stakes that largely operated on their own, while Ciudad Juarez was part of the El Paso Ward, which in turn was under the direction of the stake based in Safford, Arizona, with Spencer W. Kimball as its president.

In politics, Juarez served as a justice of the peace in San Pedro Martir, and a district judge in Tlalpan as well as vice-president of Tlalpan. He was eventually exiled to Guatemala because he challenged how the government treated the campesinos.

Later, Juarez returned to Mexico and served as an advisor to the central government on agricultural policy.

In 1961, when the Mexico City Stake was organized, Juarez was ordained a bishop by Marion G. Romney and served as the first bishop of the San Pedro Martir Ward. Juarez suffered from diabetes at the end of his life.
