= Colegio O'Farrill =

Private school in Tlalpan, Mexico City

Coordinates: 19.273164°N 99.206608°W

Information
- Former name: Colegio Irlandés O´Farrill
- Funding type: Private school
- Founder: Martha Ventosa O'Farrill

Colegio O'Farrill is a private school in Col. Ampliación Miguel Hidalgo, Tlalpan, Mexico City. It serves early childhood through senior high school (preparatoria).

It was established as the Colegio Irlandés O´Farrill by Martha Ventosa O'Farrill.
