= Colegio Alejandro Guillot =

Private school in Tlalpan, Mexico City

Coordinates: 19.2967°N 99.1286°W

Information
- Funding type: Private school
- Website: www.alejandroguillotcolegio.edu.mx

Colegio Alejandro Guillot is a private school with three campuses in Tlalpan, Mexico City.

Its kindergarten and primary school campus is in Colonia Ex Hacienda Coapa. Its middle school campus and its high school campus are both in Colonia Nueva Oriental Coapa.
