= Instituto Escuela del Sur =

School in Tlalpan, Mexico City

Coordinates: 19.27988°N 99.19349°W

Instituto Escuela del Sur S.C. is a private middle school and high school (preparatoria) in Tlalpan, Mexico City. It opened in 1987.
