= San Andrés Totoltepec =

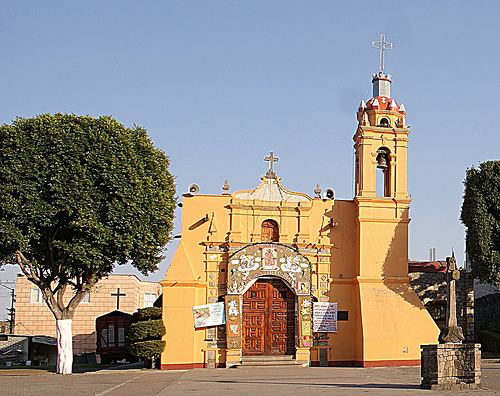

- Location within Mexico City Location within Mexico
- Coordinates: 19.249°N 99.173°W
- Country: Mexico
- Federal entity: Mexico City
- Borough: Tlalpan

San Andrés Totoltepec is a community in the borough of Tlalpan, Mexico City, Mexico. The name contains the Nahuatl elements totol ("fowl") and tepetl ("hill").

Peterson Schools has its Tlalpan campus in San Andrés Totoltepec.
