= Colegio Franco Español =

Private school in Tlalpan, Mexico City, Mexico

Coordinates: 19°17′32″N 99°09′03″W

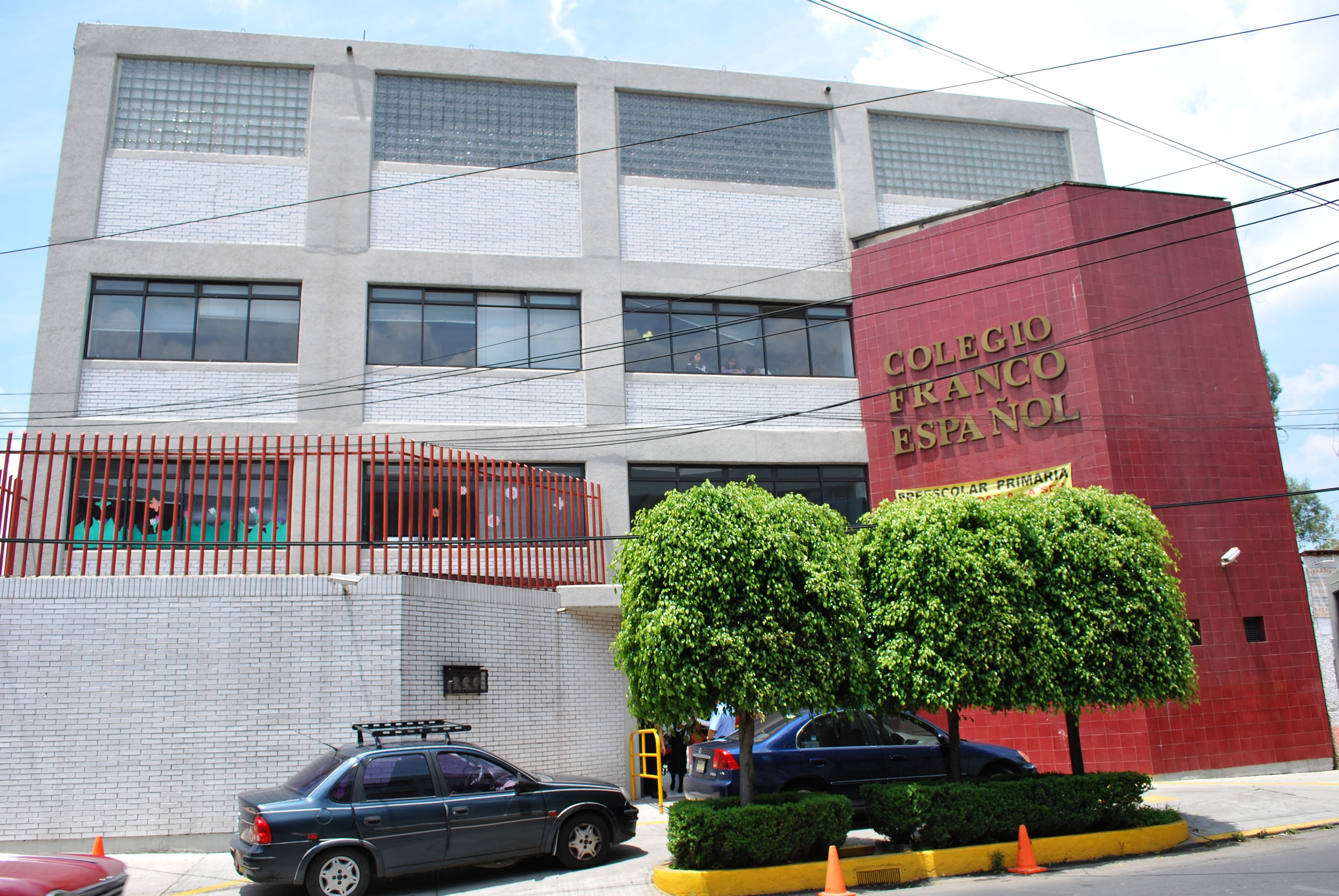
Colegio Franco Español

The Colegio Franco Español (CFE, "French-Spanish School") is a private school in the San Lorenzo Huipulco colonia in Tlalpan, Mexico City. It covers preschool through high school (preparatoria) levels.

== History ==
The school opened on January 16, 1936. It was originally located at 99 Paseo de la Reforma in the Colonia Juárez of the Cuauhtémoc delegation. It was created by a group of professionals, including French national R.J. Capdeville and Spanish national Antonio Gutiérrez L.

Construction of new facilities on the former Hacienda de Guadalupe at 1967 Av. Insurgentes began in 1938. On February 12, 1941, the school received its incorporation by the National Autonomous University of Mexico (UNAM). The Av. Insurgentes campus began holding classes during the 1942-1943 school year.

The school became boys-only in the late fifties, and it moved to Av. Miguel Ángel de Quevedo y Cerro del Hombre, in the Romero de Terreros colonia in Coyoacán. The school became coeducational again in 1977. In 1988 it moved to its current location at 88 Calzada México Xochimilco.
