= Gabriela Osorio =

Mexican politician (born 1990)

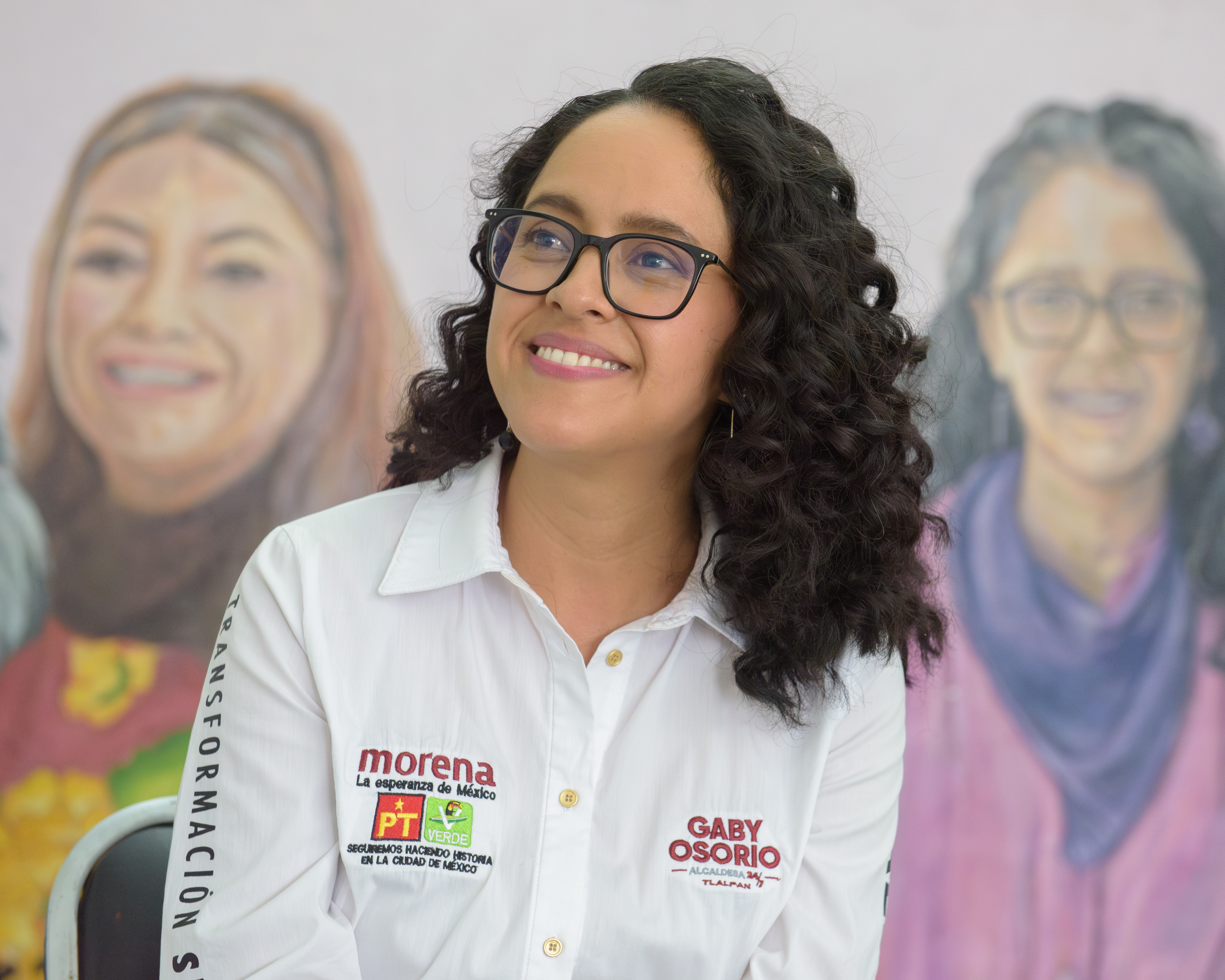
- Osorio in 2024

Mayor of Tlalpan
- Incumbent
- Assumed office 1 October 2024
- Preceded by: Alfa González Magallanes

Personal details
- Born: 29 September 1990 (age 35)
- Party: Morena (since 2014)

Gabriela Osorio Hernández (born 29 September 1990) is a Mexican politician serving as mayor of Tlalpan since 2024. From 2018 to 2021, she was a member of the Congress of Mexico City.
