= British American School (State of Mexico) =

Information
- Established: 1976
- Age range: 18 months - 18 years; (Puerto Vallarta campus); 2 years - 18 years; (Naucalpan campus)
- Language: English
- Website: https://www.british.edu.mx/

British American School, S.C. is a private international school in Naucalpan, State of Mexico in Greater Mexico City. It serves levels kindergarten (Kinder) through high school (bachillerato).

== History ==
The school was founded in 1976.

It was previously in Tlalpan, Mexico City. As of 2025, the school has two campuses: one in Puerto Vallarta and one in Naucalpan. The Puerto Vallarta campus was opened in 1990.
