= Area codes in Mexico by code (0–99) =

The 0–99 range of area codes in Mexico serve the country's three largest cities. Area code 33 serves the Metropolitan area of Guadalajara, Jalisco, area code 55 and area code 56 serve the Metropolitan area of Mexico City (Mexico State and the CDMX), and area code 81 serves the Metropolitan area of Monterrey, Nuevo León. The country code of Mexico is 52.

For other areas, see Area codes in Mexico by code.

City	State	Code	Ref.
Base Aérea Militar No. 5	Jalisco	33	
Buenavista	Jalisco	33	
Cajititlán	Jalisco	33	
Centro de Readaptación Social	Jalisco	33	
Club de Golf Santa Anita	Jalisco	33	
Colonia Guadalupana	Jalisco	33	
Coyula	Jalisco	33	
El Salto	Jalisco	33	
Emiliano Zapata	Jalisco	33	
Guadalajara	Jalisco	33	
La Calera	Jalisco	33	
La Primavera	Jalisco	33	
La Tijera	Jalisco	33	
La Venta del Astillero	Jalisco	33	
Las Cañadas (Bosques de San Isidro)	Jalisco	33	
Las Pintas	Jalisco	33	
Loma Bonita	Jalisco	33	
Nicolás R. Casillas	Jalisco	33	
Nuevo México	Jalisco	33	
Palomar	Jalisco	33	
Puente Grande	Jalisco	33	
Rancho Contento	Jalisco	33	
Río Blanco	Jalisco	33	
San Esteban	Jalisco	33	
San Gaspar de las Flores	Jalisco	33	
San Isidro Mazatepec	Jalisco	33	
San José del Castillo	Jalisco	33	
San Juan Evangelista	Jalisco	33	
San Martín de las Flores de Abajo	Jalisco	33	
San Miguel Cuyutlán	Jalisco	33	
San Nicolás	Jalisco	33	
San Sebastián El Grande	Jalisco	33	
Santa Anita	Jalisco	33	
Santa Cruz de la Loma	Jalisco	33	
Santa Cruz de las Flores	Jalisco	33	
Santa Cruz del Valle	Jalisco	33	
Tesistán (San Francisco Tesistán)	Jalisco	33	
Tlajomulco de Zuñiga	Jalisco	33	
Tlaquepaque	Jalisco	33	
Tonalá	Jalisco	33	
Zapopan	Jalisco	33	
Zapote del Valle (Zapote de Santa Cruz)	Jalisco	33	
Santiago Cuautlalpan (Mp. Tepotzot)	Mexico State	55 / 56	
Axotlán	Mexico State	55 / 56	
Buenavista	Mexico State	55 / 56	
Campo Militar N. 37B (El Cabi)	Mexico State	55 / 56	
Chalco	Mexico State	55 / 56	
Chimalhuacán	Mexico State	55 / 56	
Ciudad López Mateos	Mexico State	55 / 56	
Ciudad Nezahualcoyotl	Mexico State	55 / 56	
Coatepec	Mexico State	55 / 56	
Cocotitlán	Mexico State	55 / 56	
Colonia El Mirador	Mexico State	55 / 56	
Cuautitlán Izcalli	Mexico State	55 / 56	
Cuautitlán	Mexico State	55 / 56	
Ecatepec de Morelos	Mexico State	55 / 56	
Fuentes del Valle	Mexico State	55 / 56	
Huixquilucan	Mexico State	55 / 56	
Ixtapaluca	Mexico State	55 / 56	
Las Cabañas	Mexico State	55 / 56	
Loma del Río	Mexico State	55 / 56	
Los Reyes Acaquilpan	Mexico State	55 / 56	
Magdalena Chichicaspa	Mexico State	55 / 56	
Melchor Ocampo	Mexico State	55 / 56	
Naucalpan de Juárez	Mexico State	55 / 56	
Ojo de Agua	Mexico State	55 / 56	
Ozumbilla(Ejido El Zapote)	Mexico State	55 / 56	
Progreso Industrial	Mexico State	55 / 56	
Pueblo Tecamac	Mexico State	55 / 56	
Rancho Coxtitlán	Mexico State	55 / 56	
Rancho Tlalmimilolpan	Mexico State	55 / 56	
Río Frío, Mexico	Mexico State	55 / 56	
Salazar	Mexico State	55 / 56	
San Francisco Acuautla	Mexico State	55 / 56	
San Francisco Chimalpa	Mexico State	55 / 56	
San Francisco Coacalco	Mexico State	55 / 56	
San Francisco Magu	Mexico State	55 / 56	
San Gregorio Cuautzingo	Mexico State	55 / 56	
San José El Vidrio	Mexico State	55 / 56	
San José Tejamanil	Mexico State	55 / 56	
San Juan de las Tablas	Mexico State	55 / 56	
San Luis Ayucan	Mexico State	55 / 56	
San Martín Cuautlalpan	Mexico State	55 / 56	
San Pablo Atlazalpan	Mexico State	55 / 56	
San Vicente Chicoloapán	Mexico State	55 / 56	
Santa Ana Jilotzingo	Mexico State	55 / 56	
Santa Cruz Ayotuzco	Mexico State	55 / 56	
Santa Cruz	Mexico State	55 / 56	
Santa María Magdalena Cahuacán	Mexico State	55 / 56	
Santa María Mazatla	Mexico State	55 / 56	
Santa María Tonanitla	Mexico State	55 / 56	
Santiago Yancuitlalpan	Mexico State	55 / 56	
Temamatla	Mexico State	55 / 56	
Tepojaco	Mexico State	55 / 56	
Tepotzotlán	Mexico State	55 / 56	
Tlalnepantla	Mexico State	55 / 56	
Tlazala de Fabela	Mexico State	55 / 56	
Transfiguración	Mexico State	55 / 56	
Tultepec	Mexico State	55 / 56	
Tultitlán de Mariano Escobedo	Mexico State	55 / 56	
Villa Nicolás Romero	Mexico State	55 / 56	
Xico	Mexico State	55 / 56	
Zacamulpa	Mexico State	55 / 56	
Alvaro Obregón	Federal District	55 / 56	
Azcapotzalco	Federal District	55 / 56	
Benito Juárez	Federal District	55 / 56	
Coyoacán	Federal District	55 / 56	
Cuajimalpa de Morelos	Federal District	55 / 56	
Cuauhtémoc	Federal District	55 / 56	
Gustavo A. Madero	Federal District	55 / 56	
Iztacalco	Federal District	55 / 56	
Iztapalapa	Federal District	55 / 56	
La Magdalena Contreras	Federal District	55 / 56	
Miguel Hidalgo	Federal District	55 / 56	
Parres (El Guarda)	Federal District	55 / 56	
San Antonio Tecómitl	Federal District	55 / 56	
San Bartolome Xicomulco	Federal District	55 / 56	
San Juan Ixtayopan	Federal District	55 / 56	
San Lorenzo Acopilco	Federal District	55 / 56	
San Miguel Ajusco	Federal District	55 / 56	
San Miguel Topilejo	Federal District	55 / 56	
San Nicolás Tetelco	Federal District	55 / 56	
San Pablo Oztotepec	Federal District	55 / 56	
San Pedro Atocpan	Federal District	55 / 56	
Santa Catarina Yecahuitzotl	Federal District	55 / 56	
Tláhuac	Federal District	55 / 56	
Tlalpan	Federal District	55 / 56	
Venustiano Carranza	Federal District	55 / 56	
Villa Milpa Alta	Federal District	55 / 56	
Xochimilco	Federal District	55 / 56	
Aeropuertos	Nuevo León	81	
Carmen	Nuevo León	81	
Ciudad Apodaca	Nuevo León	81	
Ciudad Benito Juárez	Nuevo León	81	
Ciudad General Escobedo	Nuevo León	81	
Ciudad Santa Catarina	Nuevo León	81	
Ciudad Satélite del Norte	Nuevo León	81	
El Barrial, Nuevo León (Rancho de los Benavides)	Nuevo León	81	
García	Nuevo León	81	
Guadalupe	Nuevo León	81	
Juárez	Nuevo León	81	
Los Ayala	Nuevo León	81	
Monterrey	Nuevo León	81	
Monterrey (Valle Alto)	Nuevo León	81	
Parque Ind. Cienega de Flores	Nuevo León	81	
Parque Industrial Ciudad Mitras	Nuevo León	81	
Salinas Victoria	Nuevo León	81	
San Nicolás de los Garza	Nuevo León	81	
San Pedro Garza García	Nuevo León	81	
Santiago (El Cercado)	Nuevo León	81	
Villas Campestres	Nuevo León	81	
