= Telephone numbers in Mexico =

- Location of Mexico
- Country: Mexico
- Continent: North America
- Regulator: Telecommunications Regulatory Commission
- Numbering plan type: Closed
- NSN length: 10
- Format: XX XXXX XXXX; XXX XXX XXXX
- Numbering plan: Plan Técnico Fundamental de Numeración
- Last updated: 24 November 2023
- Country code: 52
- International access: 00

Telephone numbers in Mexico are regulated by the Telecommunications Regulatory Commission, an independent government agency of Mexico. The agency published the Fundamental Technical Plan for Numbering (Spanish: Plan Técnico Fundamental de Numeración) on May 11, 2013. The plan establishes a uniform ten-digit telephone number format. It took effect on August 3, 2019.

== Telephone number format ==
All telephone numbers in Mexico have ten digits, of which the first identifies one of the eight principal geographic regions of the country.

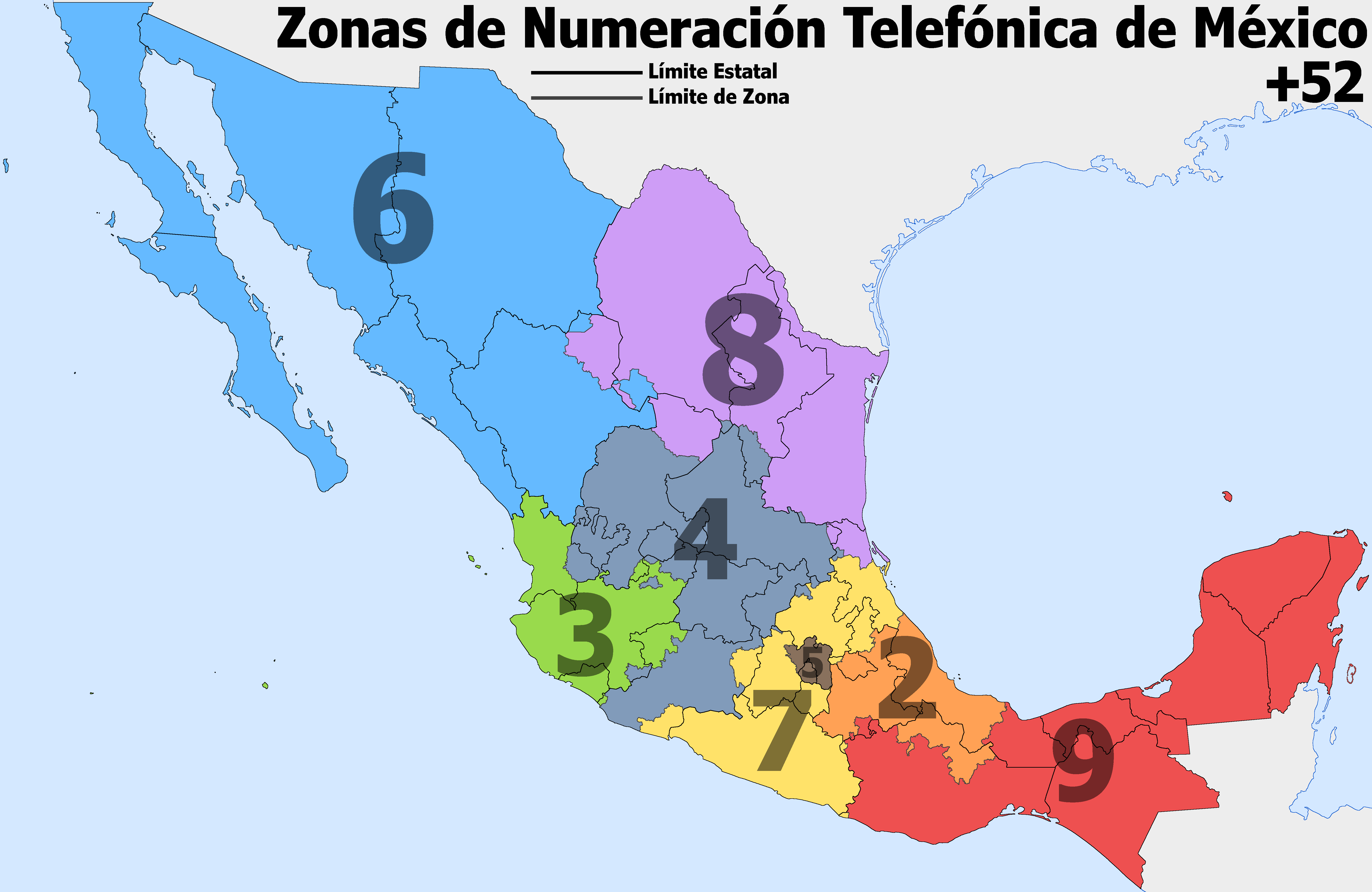
Map of principal geographic codes in Mexico

Prefix	Region
2	East
3	West
4	North
5	Center (Mexico City metropolitan area)
6	Northwest
7	Southwest
8	Northeast
9	Southeast

The national number is formed by prefixing the previously existing local number format with an area code. All ten digits must be dialed for all calls.

== Dialing prefixes ==
Since August 3, 2019, only the following dialing prefixes are available for use within Mexico:

Prefix	Use	Format
00	International direct dialing	00 + country code + local phone number

== Dialing into Mexico ==
Destinations in Mexico are dialed from foreign location by dialing the foreign country's International access code (011 within the NANP area, 00 in many other countries), the country code 52, and the ten-digit national telephone number of the destination. As of 2020, the dialing procedure for mobile phones in Mexico no longer requires the inclusion of the number '1' after the country code. The procedure for calling landlines remains unchanged.

== History ==
Until August 3, 2019, telephone numbers in Mexico consisted of ten digits with either two-digit area codes (for Mexico City, Monterrey, and Guadalajara and their respective metropolitan areas) or three-digit area codes for the rest of the country. New area codes were assigned in the overlay format to address number exhaustion: in 2017, Toluca and Puebla and in 2018, León, Mexico City, and Tijuana.

In the early development of International Direct Distance Dialing (IDDD), Mexico elected to join World Zone 5, instead of joining the North American Numbering Plan (NANP). Since the 1960s, the Bell System had already established technical infrastructure to include Mexico in the NANP routing system, and continued to maintain special dialing arrangements using NANP area codes 903 (northwest Mexico) and 905 (Mexico City) from the US into Mexico, because of high community interest into the 1980s. Use of the area codes was formally discontinued on February 1, 1991, requiring callers to use international dialing.

=== Area codes ===
Major cities and metropolitan areas have the following codes:

Area code	City or metropolitan area
55 / 56	Mexico City
81	Monterrey, Nuevo León
33	Guadalajara, Jalisco
656 / 657	Ciudad Juárez, Chihuahua
614	Chihuahua, Chihuahua
618	Durango, Durango
999 / 990	Mérida, Yucatán
221 / 222	Puebla, Puebla
442 / 446	Querétaro, Querétaro
449	Aguascalientes, Aguascalientes
663 / 664	Tijuana, Baja California
612	La Paz, Baja California Sur
624	Los Cabos, Baja California Sur
844	Saltillo, Coahuila
686	Mexicali, Baja California
667	Culiacán, Sinaloa
722 / 729	Toluca, Mexico
998	Cancún, Quintana Roo
871	Torreón, Coahuila
744	Acapulco, Guerrero
444 / 440	San Luis Potosí, San Luis Potosí
833	Tampico, Tamaulipas
477 / 479	León, Guanajuato
961	Tuxtla Gutiérrez, Chiapas
662	Hermosillo, Sonora
633	Agua Prieta, Sonora
645	Cananea, Sonora
644	Cd. Obregón, Sonora
642	Navojoa, Sonora
631	Nogales, Sonora
229	Veracruz, Veracruz
443	Morelia, Michoacán
921	Coatzacoalcos, Veracruz
771	Pachuca, Hidalgo
981	Campeche, Campeche
899	Reynosa, Tamaulipas
868	Matamoros, Tamaulipas
492	Zacatecas, Zacatecas

== Dialing prefixes prior to 2019 ==
Prefix	Use	Format	Digits after prefix
00	International direct dialing	00 + country code + area code + phone number	-
01	Domestic direct dialing	01 + area code + phone number	10
02	Domestic operator dialing	02 + area code + phone number	10
09	International operator dialing	09 + country code + area code + phone number	-
044	Local cell phone from a land line	044 + area code + phone number	10
-	Cell phone from a cell phone	area code + phone number	10
045	Domestic cell phone from a land line	045 + area code + phone number	10
-	Domestic cell phone from a cell phone	area code + phone number	10

== Other service numbers ==
#	Services
020	Operator-assisted domestic collect call (Telmex)
030	Local time (Telmex)
031	Wake up service
040	Information / directory
050	Phone company hotline
051	Number portability PIN (can be used to determine your own line's phone number)
070	City hotline (not available in some cities)
071	CFE hotline (electric company)
072	[Reporte de Servicios de Ciudad] hotline (Water Troubles, Bad Road, Etc... not available in some cities)
090	Operator-assisted international collect call
911	Emergency telephone number (since 2016)

== See also ==
- Area codes in Mexico by code
