= IEMS =

IEMS may refer to:

- Instituto de Educación Media Superior del Distrito Federal, Mexican institute
- Integrated Emergency Medical Service
- A pair of in-ear monitors are called IEMs
