= Handcrafts and folk art in Hidalgo =

Crafts in Mexican state

Hidalgo (state) handcrafts and folk art are mostly made for local consumption rather than for collectors, although there have been efforts to promote this work to a wider market. Most are utilitarian and generally simply decorated, if decorated at all. The most important handcraft traditions are pottery, especially in the municipality of Huejutla and textiles, which can be found in diverse parts of the state. Most artisans are indigenous, with the Otomi populations of the Mezquital Valley being the most dominant. Other important handcrafts include basketry, metal and wood working.

== Importance ==
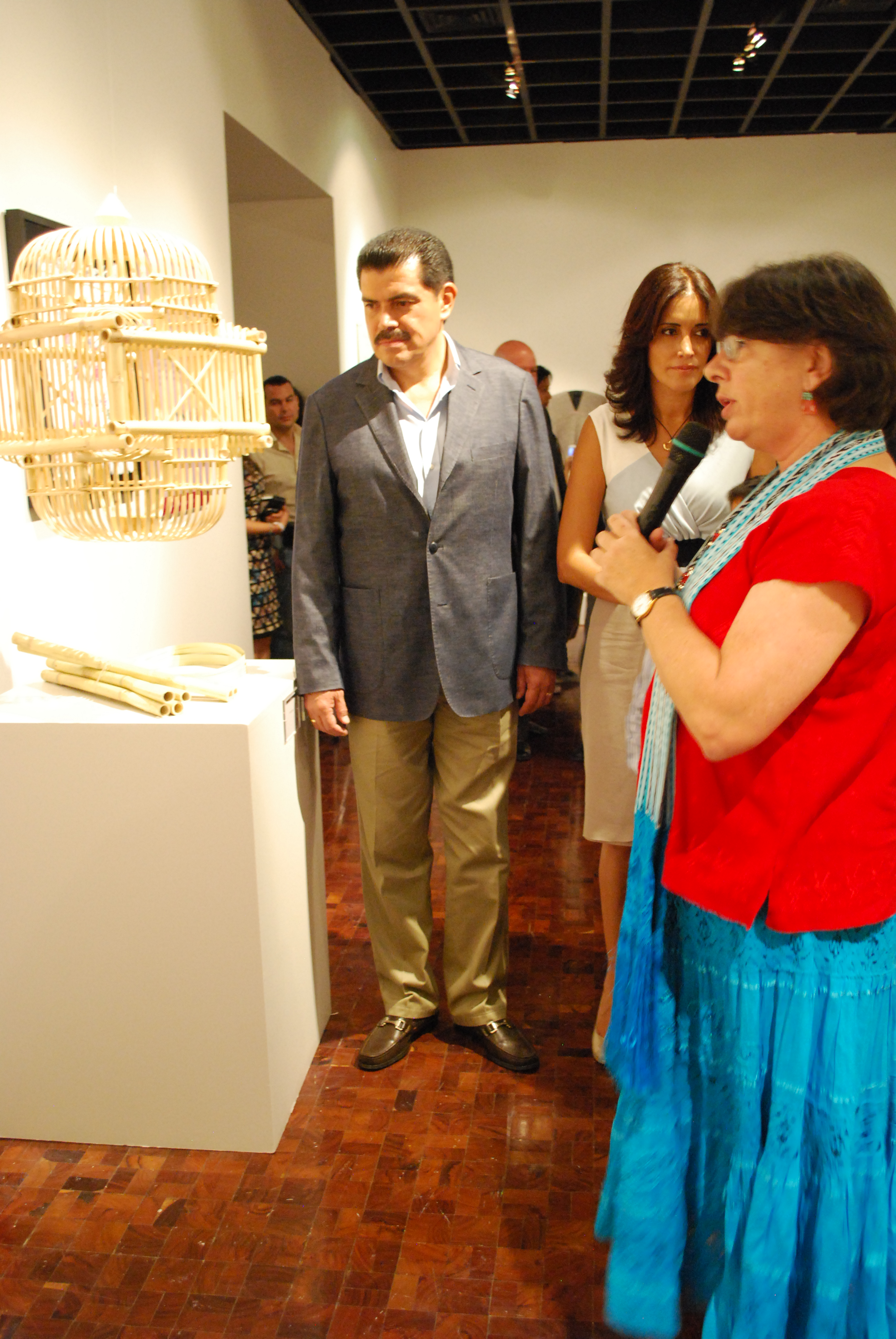
Governor of Hidalgo, José Francisco Olvera Ruiz, touring an exhibition of Hidalgo handcrafts at the Museo de Arte Popular in Mexico City in 2011

Handcrafts are not a primary economic activity of the state. Most artisans of the state are indigenous and live in socioeconomically marginalized areas, making mostly utilitarian items such as pottery and textiles for local markets.

The main economic activities are mining and the making of pulque, which has influenced the development of the state’s handcrafts. The maguey plant from which pulque is made, is also the source for ixtle fiber. However, mining has not yielded a large industry in the working of gold and silver, which instead has been worked in other parts of Mexico, such as Mexico City and Guadalajara.

However, more recently the state government has implemented a program to protect, develop and promote its traditional handcrafts through the training of artisans, creating sales outlets, competitions for state artisans and registration of particular handcraft traditions. In 2011, the state and the Museo de Arte Popular held a special exhibit of Hidalgo handcrafts in Mexico City. Mexican president Enrique Peña Nieto presented handcrafts from the state during a state visit to France in 2015, which included embroidered items from Tenango de Doria. Pachuca is home to the Casa de Artesanías Hidarte, which is an outlet for the major handcraft traditions of the state. These include bells from Tlahuelompa, miniature wooden instruments from Ixmiquilpan, basketry from the Mezquital Valley, brass from Tepojaco, copper from Tizapán, human figures and more of obsidian from Nopalillo, various textiles included embroidered wares, silver and leaver work from various parts of the state.

== Regional cultures ==
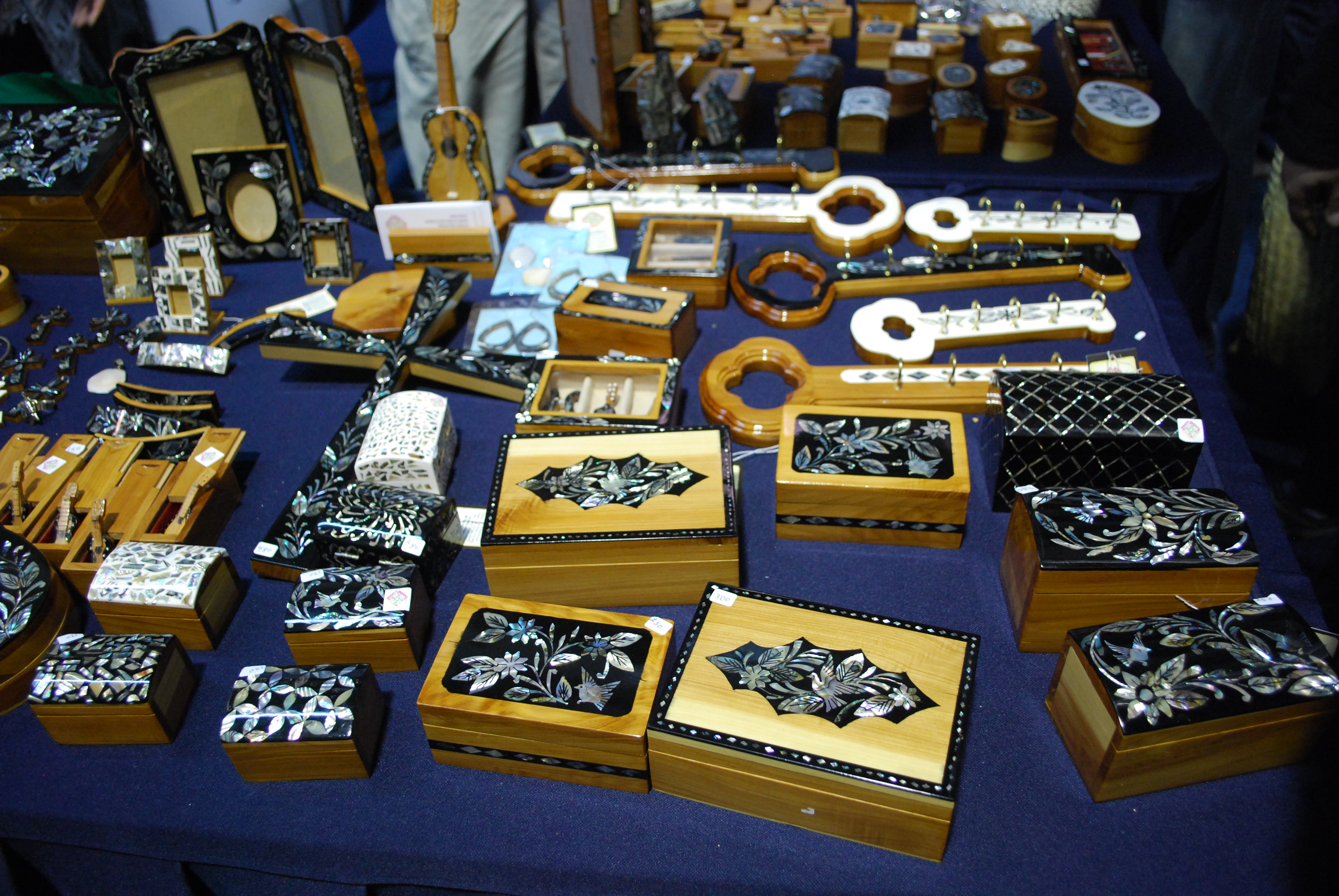
Wood items inlaid with shell from Ixmiquilpan

The state of Hidalgo is divided into five cultural and geographic regions:the Mezquital Valley, La Huasteca Hidalguense, La Sierra Tepehua, La Sierra and Altiplanicie Pulquera. Three of these are particularly noted for their handcraft styles. The Mezquital Valley is the center of the state Otomi population, the most numerous indigenous group. The crafts of this valley are characterized by this ethnicity, as well as the vegetation of the semi-arid area. Most are made for local use with a number conserving pre-Hispanic techniques and designs. Textiles are made on backstrap looms, with indigenous designs which had magical-religious meanings. Another indigenous handcraft is the working of stiff fibers such as those from the maguey and lechuguilla plants to make bags, nets and some clothing items. Basketry is made with reeds and palm fronds, with cooking utensils made from wood. The city of Ixmiquilpan is the center of the Otomi population and is its main handcraft production center.

The Hidalgo part of the Huasteca region has subtropical vegetation, with an abundance of water in rivers and springs and almost no urban areas. The indigenous population here is Nahua, who have conserved many of their customs, including handcrafts techniques and designs. These crafts tend to be utilitarian rather than decorative making comals, other cooking vessels, fish traps, candles, etc., generally for domestic use. Most of these are made by women in the home, especially embroidered textiles, which are worn as part of ethnic identity.

The Tepehua region is located in the higher mountainous areas of the Sierra Alta and Sierra Gorda. Most of the population is mestizo with a sizable Tepehua indigenous community, with handcrafts that are both utilitarian and decorative. Motifs tend to be a mix of indigenous with European.

== Pottery ==
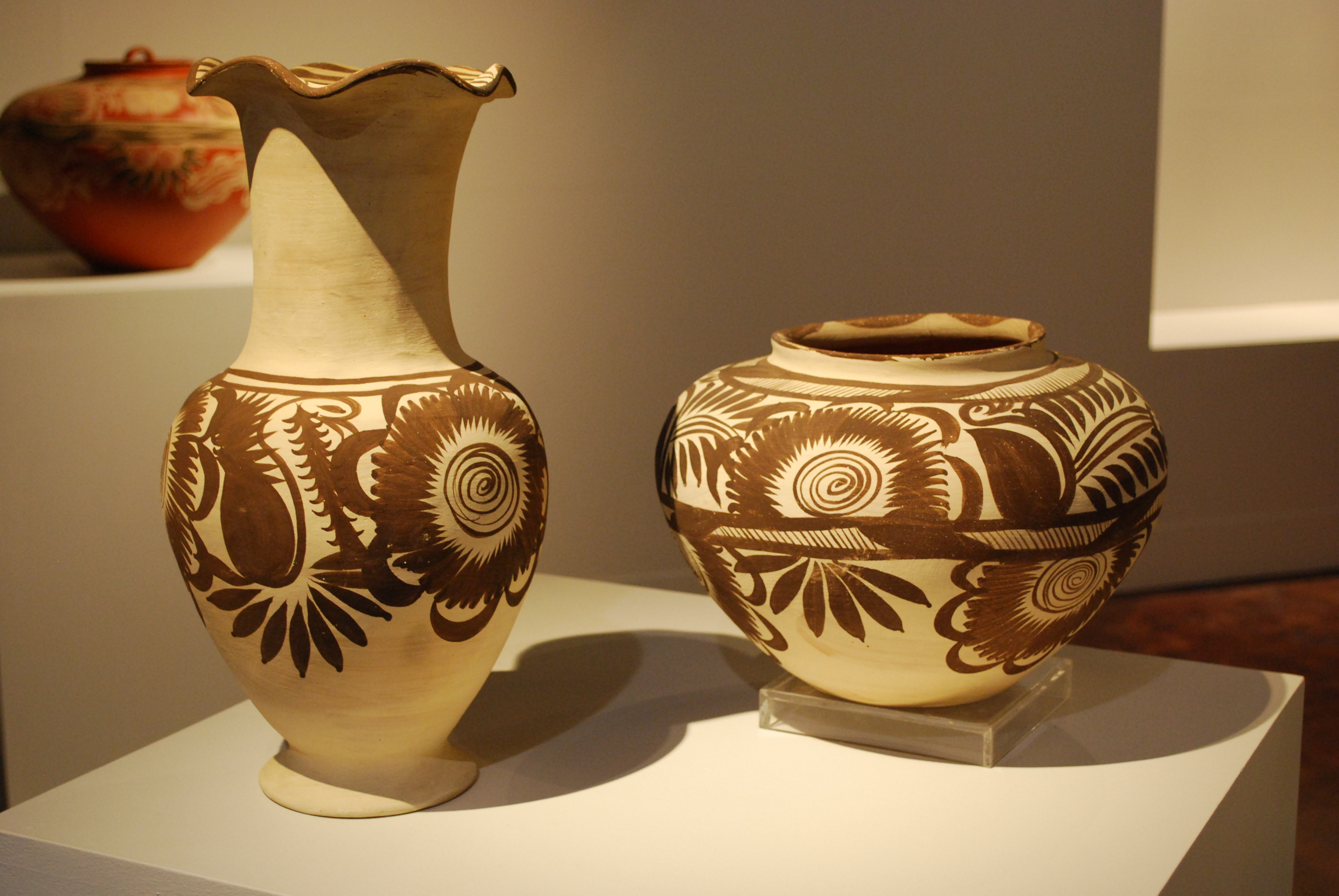
White clay pieces by Nicolas Vita Hernandez of Chililco, Huejutla

Ceramics production is local and primarily for local, domestic use, rather than for collectors of Mexican folk art. This include mostly unglazed wares such as those for the storage and cooking of food, for pulque, water jugs, comals, flower pots and gourd-shaped bowls called apiloles, along with construction materials such as floor and roof tiles. Ceramic techniques are basic and non-industrial, with most shaped by hand and fired outdoors over an open fire, or occasionally in a family kiln.

The municipality of Huejutla is home to the state’s best known pottery traditions. One of these is a white clay, unglazed, with sepia or black painted decorations and another is ochre colored unglazed pieces typically painted with white (sometimes with gray or black) lines to create flora and avian designs. These are used to make storage and serving containers for liquids and food, animal figures, candle holders, whistles and more. Both of these are centered mostly in the Huastec communiityof Chililco, but are also made in the nearby communities Macuxtepetla, Oxtomal y Tepexititla. Many of the traditional design elements have meanings, such as wavy lines for water and an “s” shape for the constellation Gemini.

Other communities also have distinctive pottery designs and traditions. Chapatongo makes jars and jugs for water, baked only once and undecorated except for naturally discolorations which naturally happen when they are fired. San Pedro de las Ollas has a small production of water jugs and flower pots distinguished with spiral motifs in black over a polished red background. Tulancingo still has some production of majolica style pottery but it has degenerated. In addition, utilitarian pottery is produced in Alfajayucan, Huasca de Ocampo and Metztitlán.

== Textiles ==
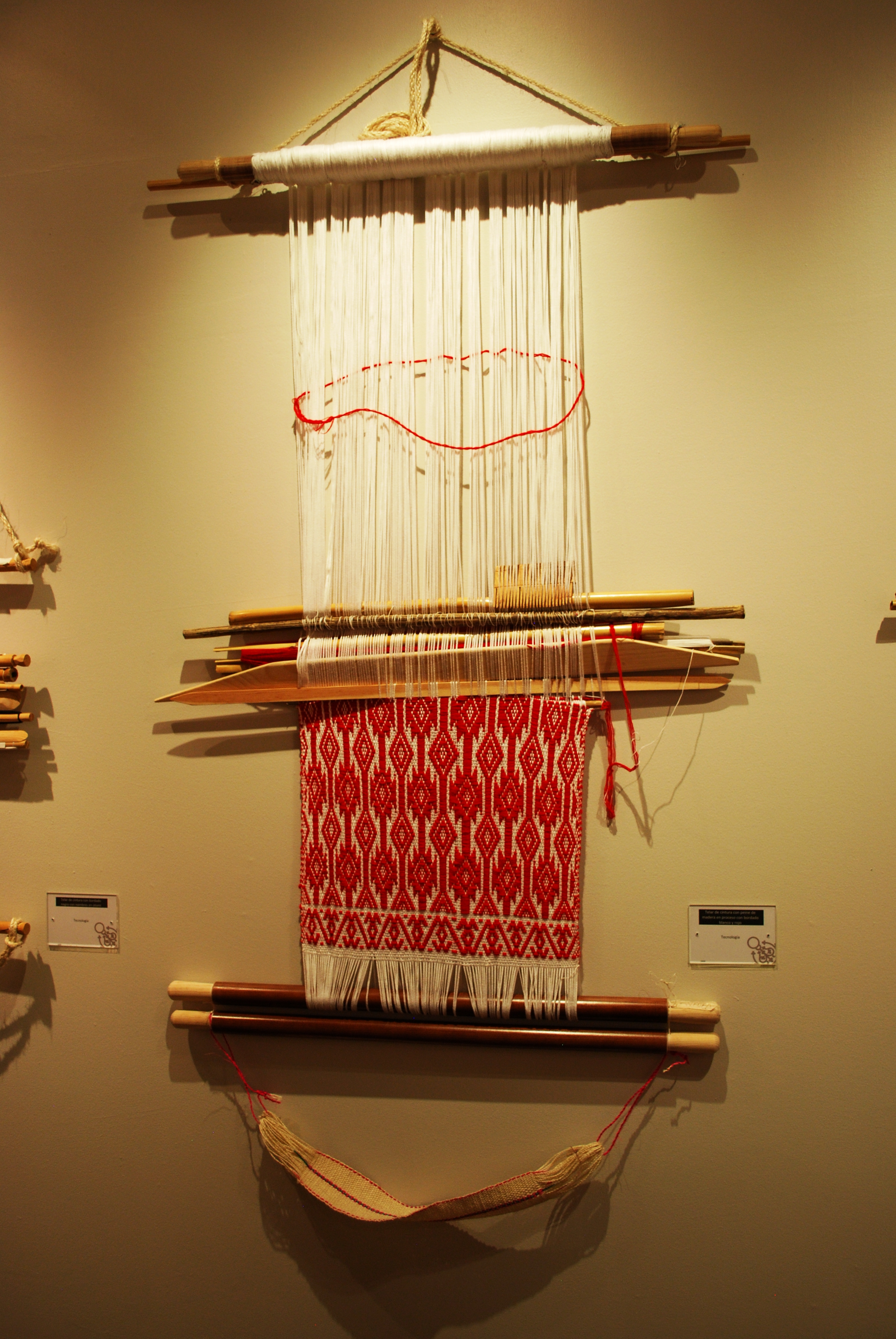
Backstrap loom with partially-finished piece at an exhibition of Hidalgo textiles

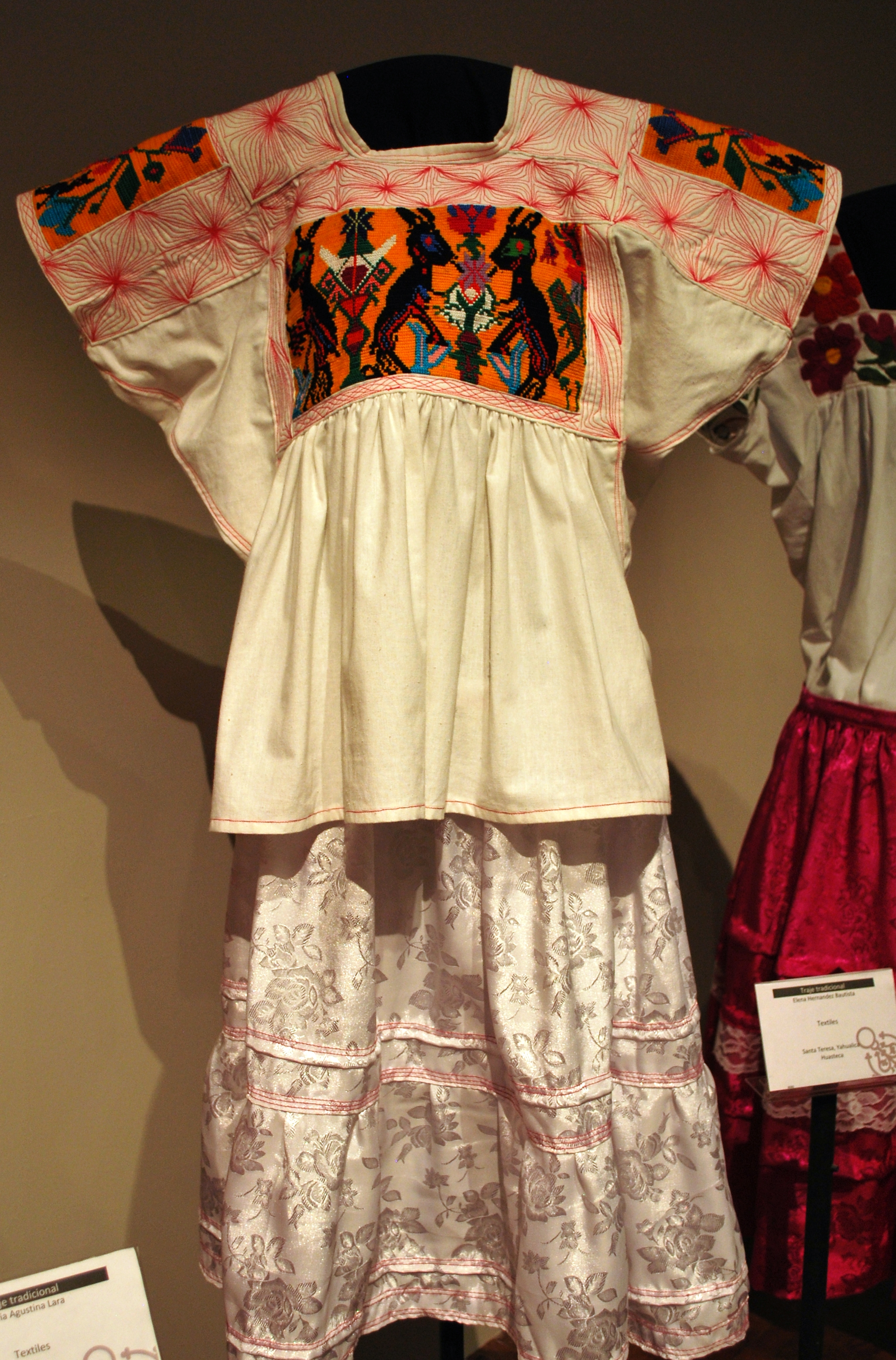
Skirt and embroidered blouse by Elena Hernandez Bautista of Santa Teresa Yahualica, Hidalgo

The making of textiles is more widespread in the state than the making of pottery. It is principally done by women, who both weave and embroider. The most common fibers are cotton and wool, as well as the native ixtle, which is derived from the maguey plant. The working of cotton was introduced in the pre Hispanic period for the making of tribute items, with wool introduced by the Spanish.

Cotton and wool are usually used to make clothing items (dresses, shirts, pants, sashes, quezquemitls) along with tablecloths, carrying bags and rugs, principally in the Huasteca region, the Mezquital Valley and Tulancingo. The most common weaving technique is with the backstrap loom, used principally to make sashes and carrying bags, but other items such as quexquemitls are made with these as well.

The quexquemitl is a distinctive feature of Otomi dress. Traditional women’s dress consists of it, a blouse, a wrap skirt held in place with a wool sash. Traditionally these are woven on backstrap looms and are embroidered with wool, cotton and sometimes acrylic thread. The embroidered designs are traditional but the meanings have mostly been lost. Traditional dress is disappearing in the state, more so for men than for women.

Tenango de Doria (Acaxochitlán) is known for its cross stitch embroidery, making sashes and other garments. However, the artisans here are best known for a style of blouse called tenangos, embroidered with a variety of animals and flowers in various colors. The town hosts an annual embroidery competition, with categories for table items, blouses and more.

Metztitlán is also known for cross-stitched items such as tablecloths, cushions and quexquemetls. In Mapethé (Cardonal), they make Persian style knotted rugs.

Ixtle is a native fiber extracted from maguey leaves, and its particularly worked in the Mezquital Valley and other semi-arid areas. Most of this fiber is rough and used to make rope, mats, carrying bags and a head covering called an ayate. However the finest ixtle thread is used to make garments. In the colonial period it substituted for linen for vestments for priests. Today it is still used to make finer ayates, with women who can make the best ixtle goods having prestige. A similar fiber is extracted from a plant called the lechuguilla for similar purposes. In Ixmiquilpan, the cooperative Rä Dni Rä Batha. (La Flor del Valle) and Huejutla make ayates and bags.

== Basketry ==
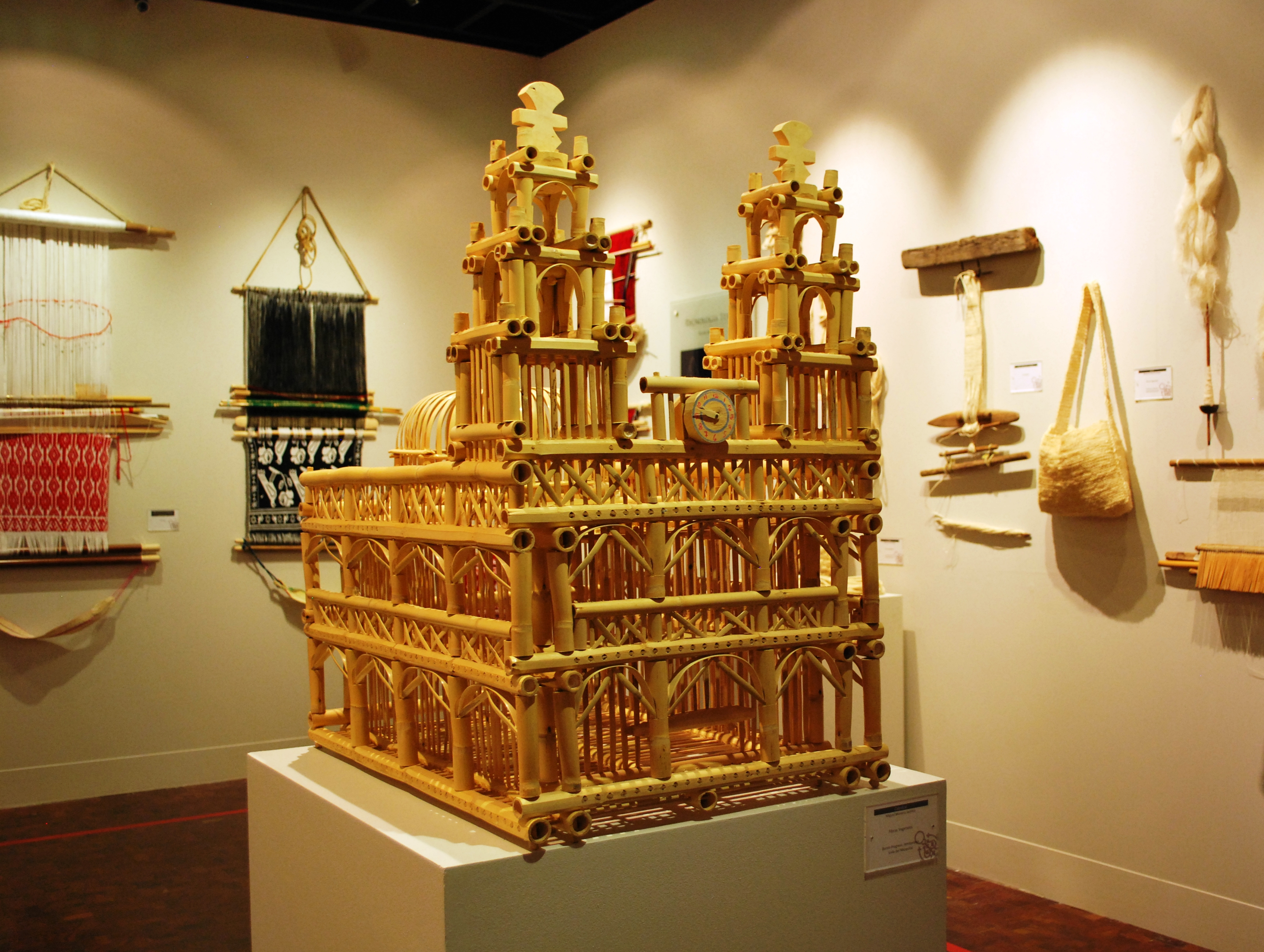
Birdcage in form of a cathedral on display at the Museo de Arte Popular in Mexico City

Basketry is still an important activity in the state, making items from willow branches, reeds and palm fronds. Items can be dyed or painted in bright colors, either using natural pigments or acrylics.

Palm fronds are used to make hats, petates, and petacas (handleless boxes used for storage) fans for starting fires, as well as baskets and toys. They are used to make traditional sombreros called garambulleros, named after a local fruit. One traditional toy is woven into the shape of a rooster, which is decorated with brightly dyed feathers. This and other toys are made in the town of Naxthey, which also makes palm and ixtle items for carrying and storage.

Reeds, whole and split, are used to make baskets of various types, flutes, toys (especially small cars) and bird cages. These birdcages are used for both pets and livestock and can be natural or in bright colors.

Willow branches are worked in Ixmilquilpan to make baskets, especially for tortillas, and rattles in the shape of doves.

Other important basketry communities include Huautla (baskets, tortilla holders and sombreros), Metztitlán, which makes items from palm fronds as well as plastic strips and Alfajayucan (sombreros).

== Metalworking ==
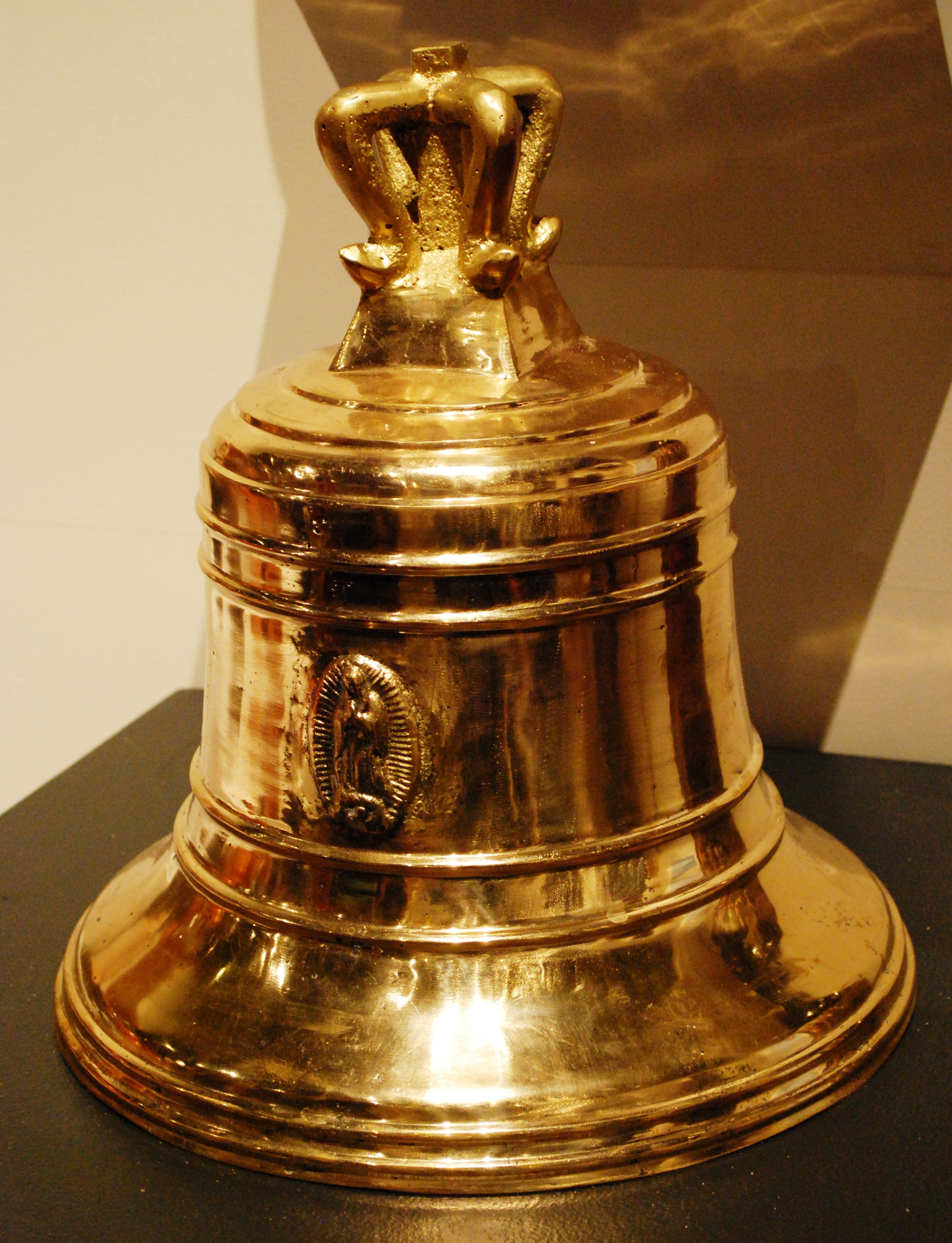
Bell cast by Jose Luis Greez Nieto of Tizapan, Zacualtipan, Hidalgo

One metal that is worked is wrought iron, mostly for utilitarian items. In the communities of El Santuario and Mapethé, they made scrapers for maguey leaves, blades for plows, hoes and blades for scythes, knives, machetes and more. More iron is worked in Huasca de Ocampo and Molango.

Copper and bronze are worked in other communities. Tizapán (Zacualtipán) is noted for its copperwares, which include pots, large pans, jars, vases, trays and sets for coffee and tea, as well as similar items in miniature. Tlahuelompa (ZacualtipánI) is noted for work in copper and bronze, especially the making of quality bells, done in various sizes. Their decoration and sound is unique to the area.

While it was never developed during the colonial period, there is some silver work done currently in Pachuca.

== Other handcrafts ==
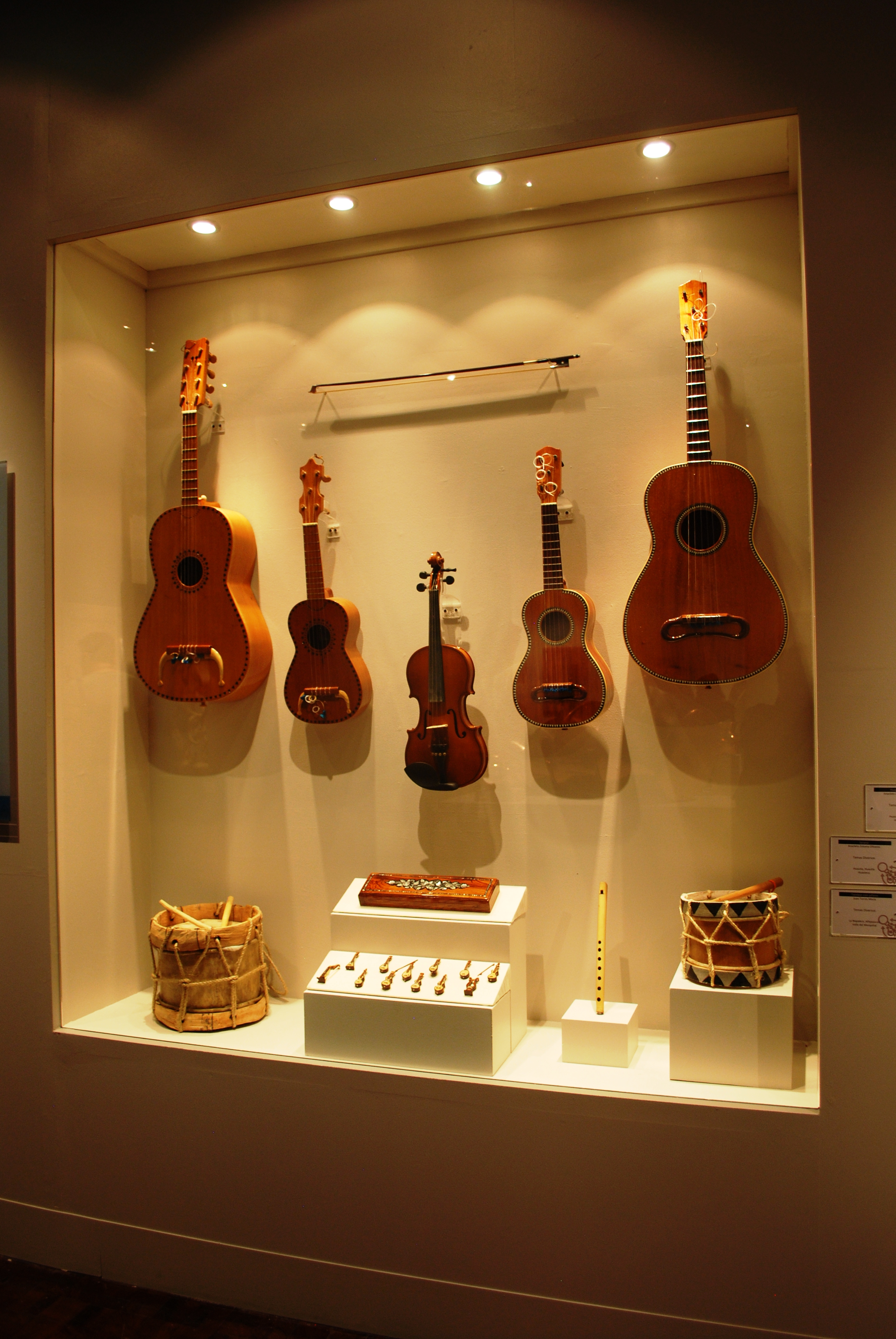
Various musical instruments such as huapangueras, jaranas, violins, drums and flutes all handmade by artisans such as Margarito Mendoza Delgadillo, Anacleto Zolueta Olivares and Juan Torres Maria for a temporary exhibit dedicated to Hidalgo at the Museo de Arte Popular, Mexico City

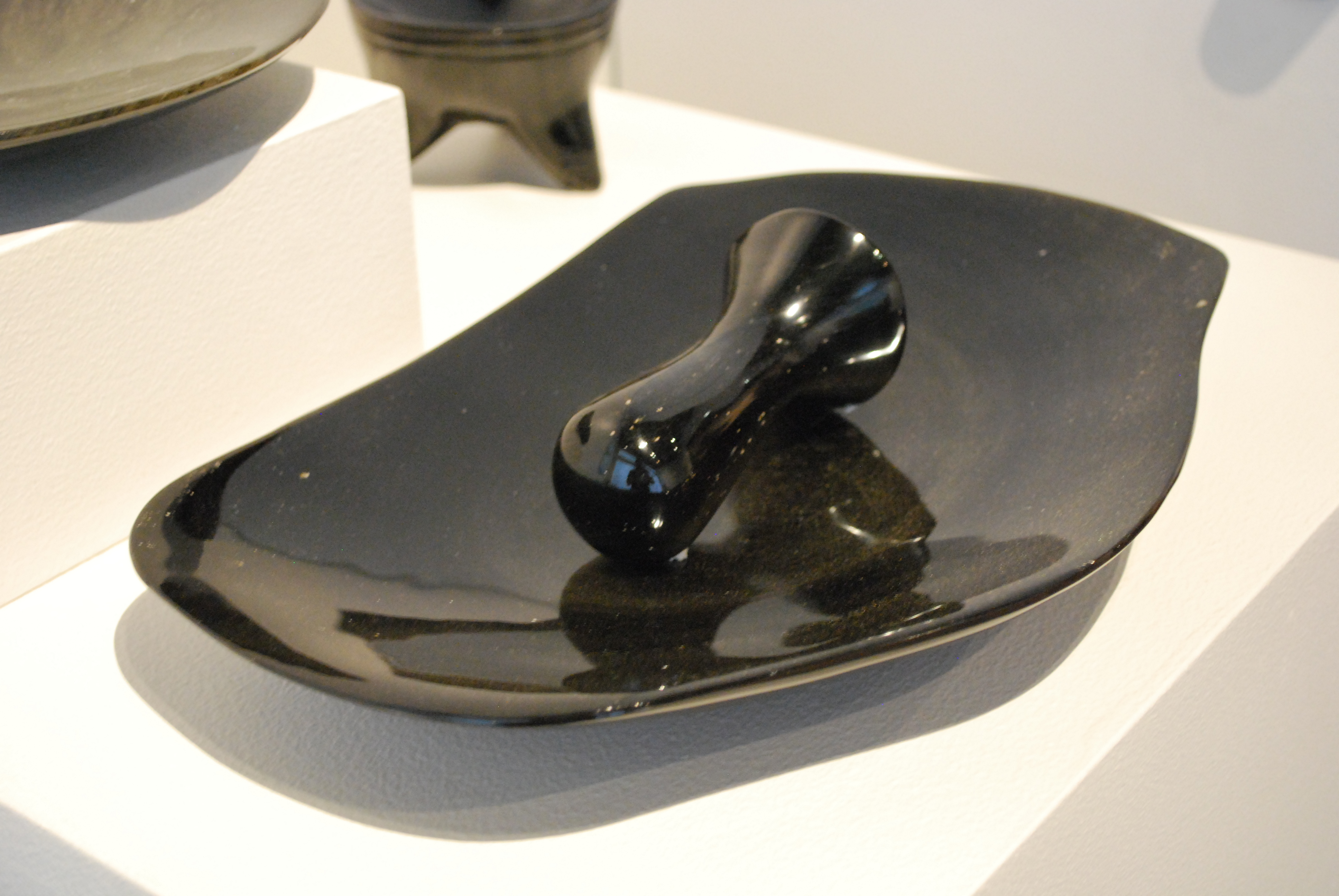
Obsidian plate and pestle by Victor Lopez Pelcastre of Nopalillo, Hidalgo

Most wood is worked for local consumption such as the carpentry activities that take place in locations such as Texkedó, Gundhó, El Delfay, Wacri and Agua Limpia. Much of the wood used is from local forests, especially pine and oyamel fir. Since the colonial period, there has been an industry here making furniture, arches, folding screens, doors and more, with one important product being furniture in Spanish colonial style. Communities noted for this work include Jaltocán and Metztitlán. Smaller objects are made as well. The community of Nith, in Ixmiquilpan is known for the making of musical instruments, picture frames and small boxes inlaid with mother-of-pearl . Other inlaid objects are also made in Ixmiquilpan, mostly for decoration. Molongo makes guitars, and in Tenango, wood is used to make utilitarian objects such as spoons and handles.

Certain items are made in relation to religious and other celebrations such as fireworks, flowered frames to decorate church doors, candles and flower garlands. In Hidalgo, the decorative items generally are distinguished by local patterns. Jaltocán makes traditional fireworks and frames for these in the shapes of bulls (toritos) and castle (castillos). Actopan makes fireworks as well.

Stone work includes decorative and functional pieces, working primarily with sandstone and marble as well as obsidian. Towns noted for this work include Actopan, Alfajayucan, Huasca de Ocampo and Huichapan.

Leather is worked in Zacualitpan, which makes shoes, as well as in Molango.

== Notable artisans ==
- Fortunato Moreno Reinoso
