= Escuela Preparatoria Tlalpan II "Otilio Montaño" =

Location
- Mexico City; Mexico

Information
- Established: 2003; 22 years ago
- Locale: San Miguel Topilejo, Tlalpan

The Escuela Preparatoria Tlalpan II "Otilio Montaño" is a senior high school in San Miguel Topilejo, Tlalpan, Mexico City. It is within the Instituto de Educación Media Superior del Distrito Federal (IEMS).

== History ==
It was the first senior high school of the rural villages of Tlalpan. In 2000, there were 27 high schools in Tlalpan, with 3 being public and the remainder being private. The delegate Salvador Martínez Della Rocca stated that 50,000 high school students, half of the borough's high school students, attended the private schools, and the other half attended the public schools. The people of San Miguel Topilejo donated a 2.5-hectare (6.2-acre) area for the high school. Institutions that promised to provide faculty included National Autonomous University of Mexico (UNAM), Universidad Autónoma Metropolitana (UAM), and Instituto Politécnico Nacional (IPN).

In 2001 Tlalpan authorities stated that if the Legislative Assembly of the Federal District (ALDF according to its Spanish name) does not permit a change in land use to allow the construction of the school, eight villages in Tlalpan would face problems with their education: Topilejo, Parres, Petlacalco, San Andrés, San Miguel Ajusco, San Pedro, Santo Tomás Ajusco, and Xicalco.

It was inaugurated on June 2, 2003 by Mexico City Head of Government Andrés Manuel López Obrador. It is intended for graduates of six area middle schools (escuelas secundarias).
