= Instituto de Educación Media Superior de la Ciudad de México =

Education system of Mexico City

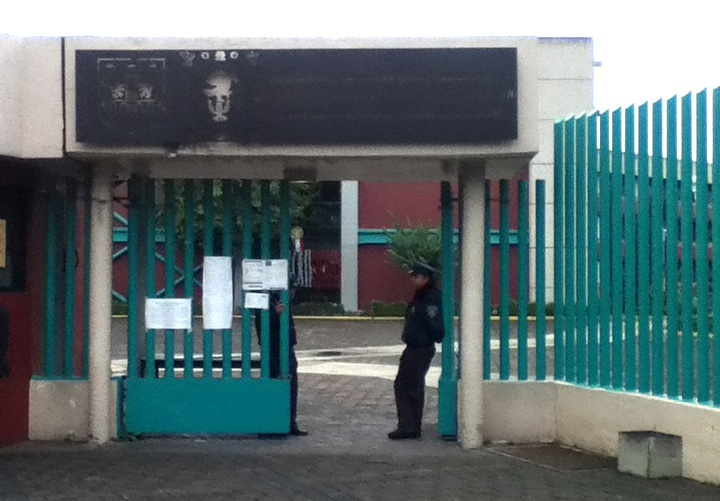
IEMS Entry

The Instituto de Educación Media Superior de la Ciudad de México (IEMS-CDMX or IEMS "High School Education Institute of Mexico City") is the public preparatoria education system of Mexico City.

The government of Mexico City founded the institution in 2000 to increase admission rates into public high schools.

== Schools ==
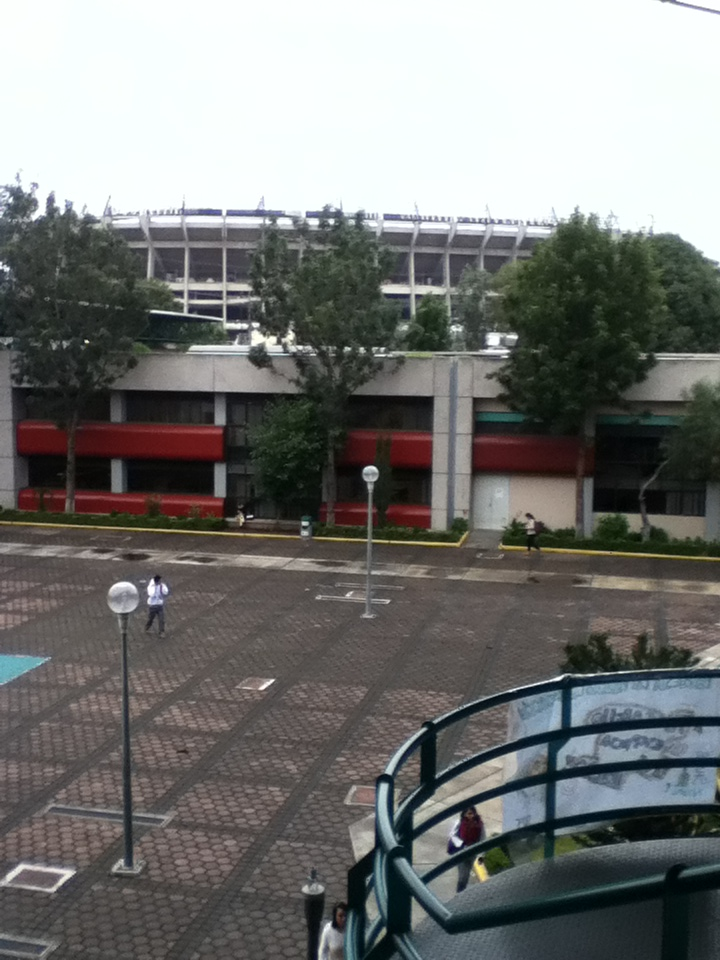
Escuela Preparatoria Coyoacán "Ricardo Flores Magón"

- Álvaro Obregón
  - Escuela Preparatoria Álvaro Obregón I "Lázaro Cárdenas del Río"
  - Escuela Preparatoria Álvaro Obregón II "Vasco de Quiroga"
- Azcapotzalco
  - Escuela Preparatoria Azcapotzalco "Melchor Ocampo"
- Coyoacán
  - Escuela Preparatoria Coyoacán "Ricardo Flores Magón"
- Cuajimalpa
  - Escuela Preparatoria Cuajimalpa "Josefa Ortiz de Domínguez"
- Gustavo A. Madero
  - Escuela Preparatoria Gustavo A. Madero I "Belisario Domínguez"
  - Escuela Preparatoria Gustavo A. Madero II "Salvador Allende"
- Iztacalco
  - Escuela Preparatoria Iztacalco "Felipe Carrillo Puerto"
- Iztapalapa
  - Escuela Preparatoria Iztapalapa I
  - Escuela Preparatoria Iztapalapa II "Benito Juárez"
  - Escuela Preparatoria Iztapalapa III "Miravalles"
  - Escuela Preparatoria Iztapalapa IV
- Magdalena Contreras
  - Escuela Preparatoria Magdalena Contreras "Ignacio Manuel Altamirano"
- Miguel Hidalgo
  - Escuela Preparatoria Miguel Hidalgo "Carmen Serdán"
- Milpa Alta
  - Escuela Preparatoria Milpa Alta "Emiliano Zapata"
- Tláhuac
  - Escuela Preparatoria Tláhuac "José Ma. Morelos y Pavón"
- Tlalpan
  - Escuela Preparatoria Tlalpan I "Gral. Francisco J. Múgica"
  - Escuela Preparatoria Tlalpan II "Otilio Montaño"
- Venustiano Carranza
  - Escuela Preparatoria Venustiano Carranza "José Revueltas Sánchez"
- Xochimilco
  - Escuela Preparatoria Xochimilco "Bernardino de Sahagún"
