= Santa Cruz del Valle =

- municipality
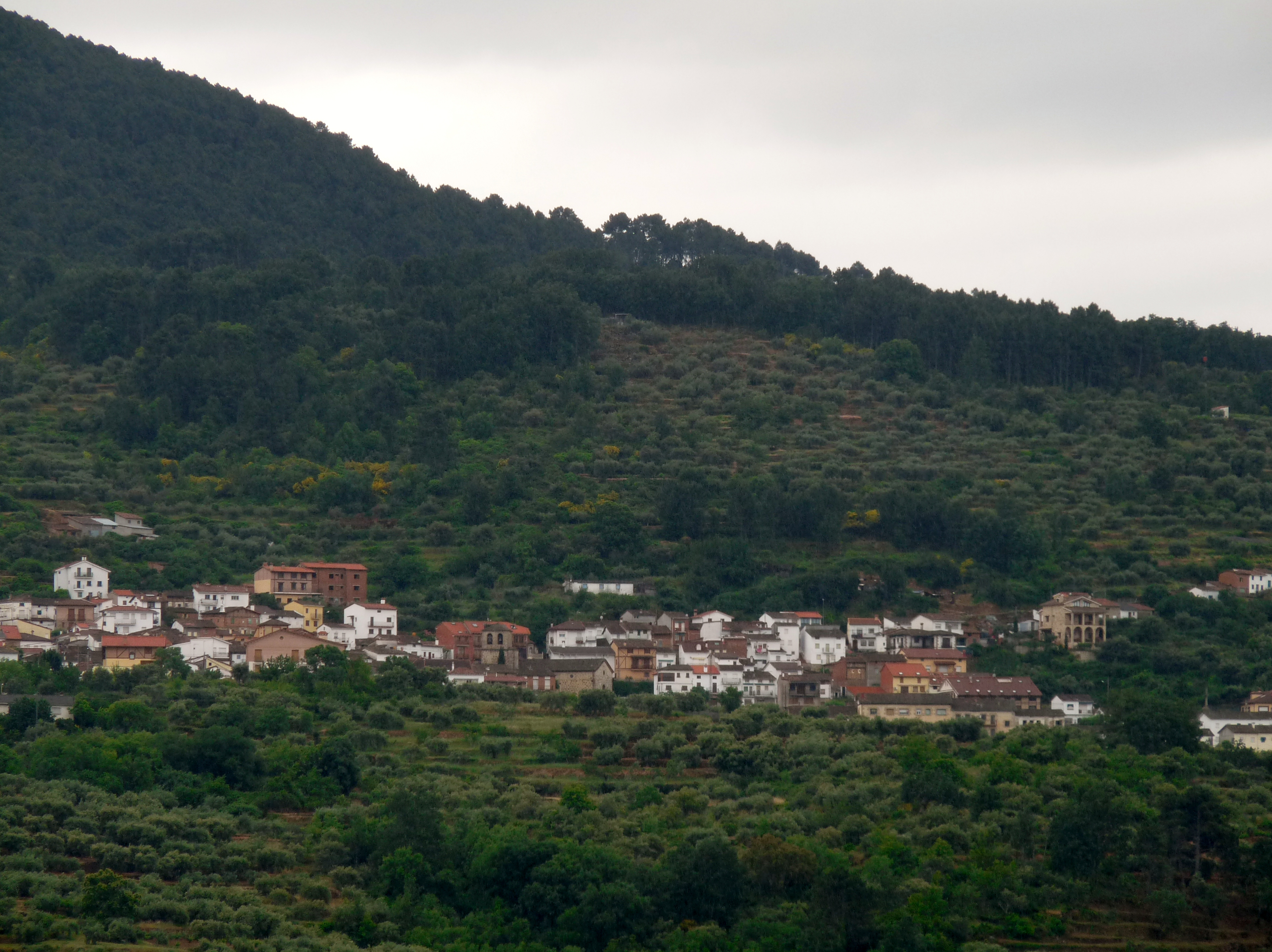
- View of Santa Cruz del Valle, Ávila, Castile and León, Spain.
- Flag Coat of arms
- Location in Spain. Santa Cruz del Valle (Spain)
- Coordinates: 40°15′03″N 5°00′14″W
- Country: Spain
- Autonomous community: Castile and León
- Province: Ávila
- Municipality: Santa Cruz del Valle

Area
  - Total: 15 km^{2} (5.8 sq mi)
- Elevation: 725 m (2,379 ft)

Population (2025-01-01)
  - Total: 295
  - Density: 20/km^{2} (51/sq mi)
- Time zone: UTC+1 (CET)
  - Summer (DST): UTC+2 (CEST)
- Website: Official website

Santa Cruz del Valle is a municipality located in the province of Ávila, Castile and León, Spain.

== Population ==
Historical population
Year	Pop.	±% p.a.
2023	322	—
2024	304	−5.59%
2025	295	−2.96%
Source: INE
