= San Francisco Chimalpa =

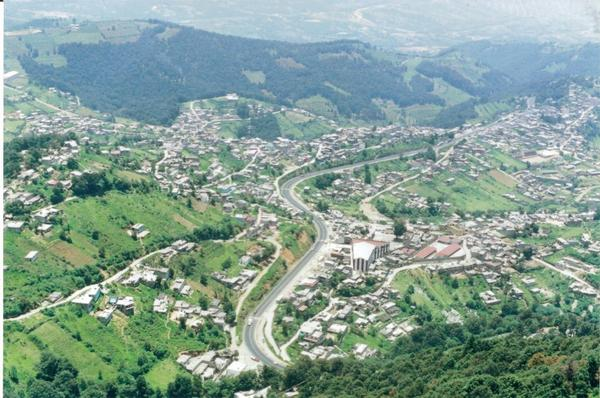

- Location within State of Mexico
- Coordinates: 19°26′31″N 99°20′31″W
- Country: Mexico
- State: Mexico
- Municipality: Naucalpan
- Elevation: 2,870 m (9,420 ft)

Population (2010)
  - Total: 8,953
- Time zone: UTC-6 (Central Standard Time)
  - Summer (DST): UTC-5 (Central Daylight Time)

San Francisco Chimalpa is a town located in the State of Mexico in Mexico. It belongs to the municipality of Naucalpan, having been one of the first towns in the municipality, where life already existed before the Tlatilco culture.
