= San Miguel Topilejo =

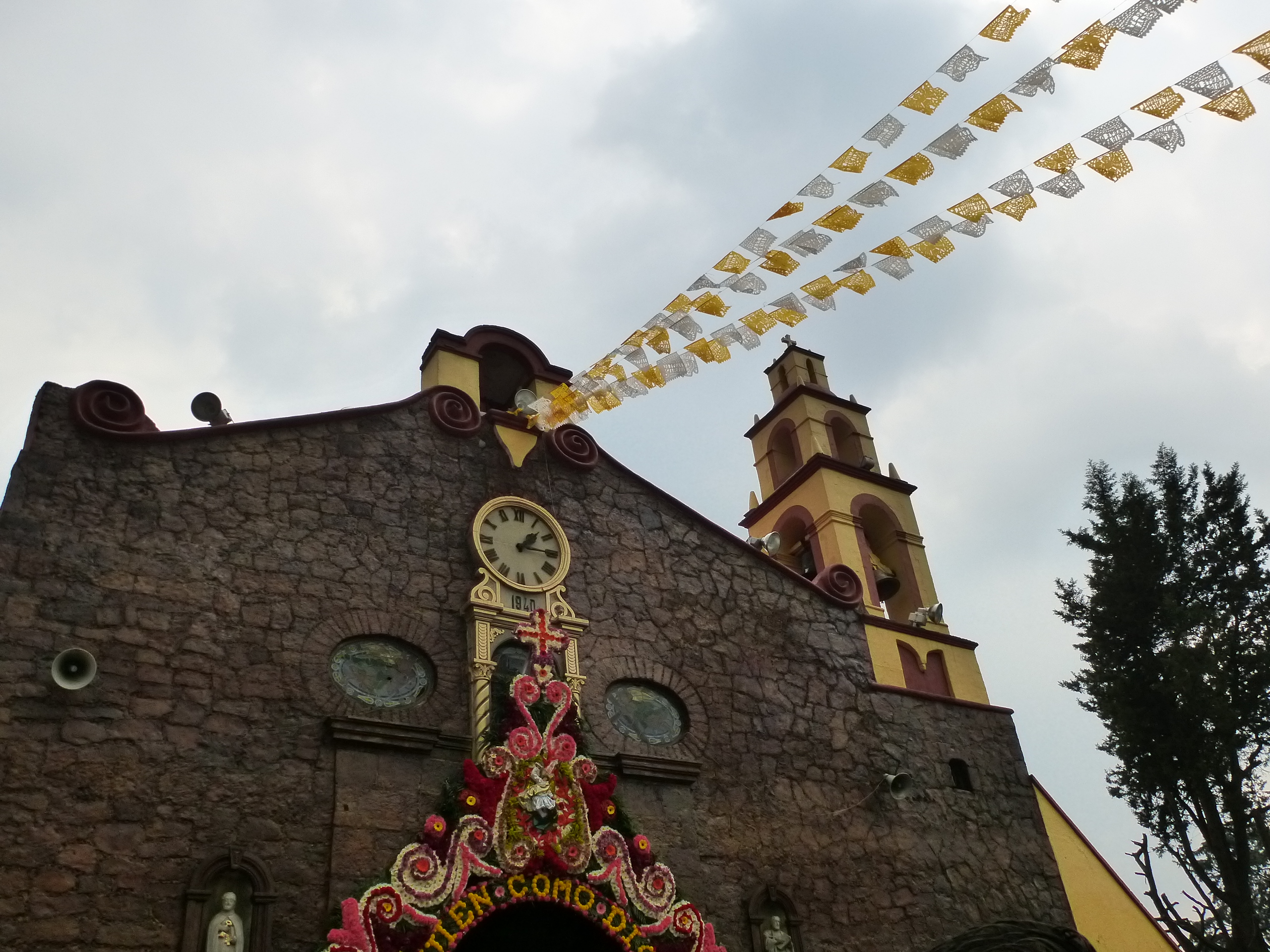
- Church in San Miguel Topilejo

- Location within Mexico City Location within Mexico
- Coordinates: 19.201309°N 99.141375°W
- Country: Mexico
- Federal entity: Mexico City
- Borough: Tlalpan

Population (2020)
  - Total: 41,087

San Miguel Topilejo is a community in the borough of Tlalpan, Mexico City, Mexico. It is one of the eight original villages in Tlalpan. The San Miguel Arcángel temple is in this community. Corn, oat, and vegetable cultivation form the backbone of its economy. The Corn Fair (feria del elote) is held here.

Escuela Preparatoria Tlalpan II "Otilio Montaño" is located in the community.
