= Tepojaco =

- Locality
- Location of Tepojaco Tepojaco (Mexico)
- Coordinates: 19°50′31″N 98°56′46″W
- Country: Mexico
- State: Hidalgo
- Municipality: Tizayuca
- Elevation: 2,284 m (7,493 ft)

Population (2020)
  - Total: 8,361

Tepojaco is locality in the municipality of Tizayuca, in the state of Hidalgo in central-eastern Mexico. It is located in Tizayuca Valley and is part of Greater Mexico City.

== Topynymy ==
Tepojaco is derived from the Nahuatl term tepoxacco, meaning "where there is tepoxactli" ("light, porous stone"). The term tepoxactli is the Nahuatl word for bath sponge.

== Geography ==
Tepojaco is located in Tizayuca Valley, with the geographic coordinates at 19°50′31″N 98°56′46″W and an altitude of 2,284 m (7,493 ft). In terms of physiography, it is part of the Trans-Mexican Volcanic Belt, within the subprovince of Lagos and volcanoes of Anáhuac; its terrain includes valley and plain. With regard to hydrography, it is positioned in the Pánuco region, within the Moctezuma River basin, in the Tezontepec River sub-basin. It has a temperate semi-dry climate.

== Demographics ==
In 2020, Tepojaco had a population of 8,361 people, which corresponds to 4.97% of the locality's population in which 4,124 were men and 4,237 were women. It also has 2,138 inhabited private homes.
