= Area code 56 (Mexico) =

Area code for Mexico City, Mexico

Area code 56 serves Mexico City and its metropolitan area. The area code was assigned in October 2018 to alleviate saturation of area code 55. Area code 56 is an overlay of area code 55, covering the same area with approximately 2,200,000 numbers assigned to this area code as of November 2018.

States in the area code: 2

State	INEGI Code
Ciudad de Mexico	09
Estado de Mexico	15

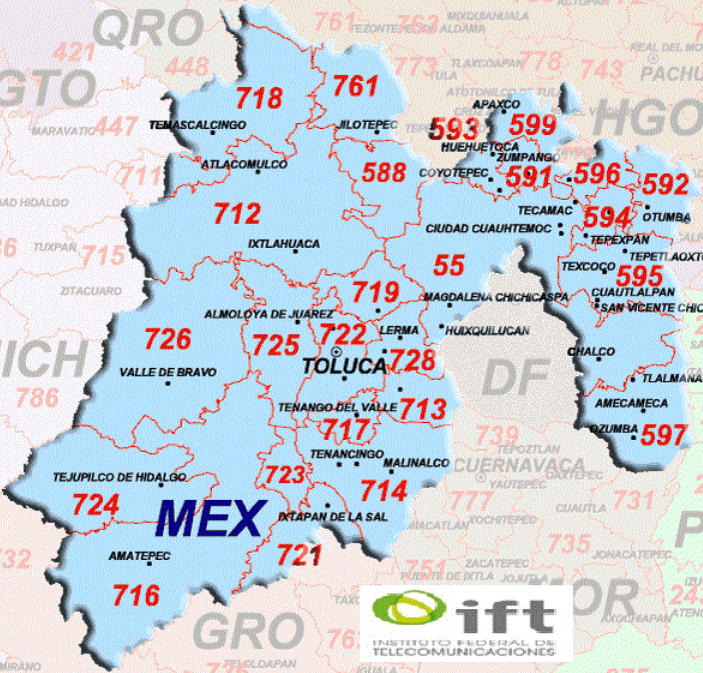
State of Mexico Code 55

Municipalities in the area code: 45

Municipality	INEGI Code
TEMAMATLA	15083
GUSTAVO A. MADERO	09005
IZTACALCO	09006
MILPA ALTA	09009
TEPOTZOTLAN	15095
COACALCO DE BERRIOZABAL	15020
COCOTITLAN	15022
TULTEPEC	15108
COYOACAN	09003
ALVARO OBREGON	09010
TLAHUAC	09011
ATIZAPAN DE ZARAGOZA	15013
IXTAPALUCA	15039
LA MAGDALENA CONTRERAS	09008
MIGUEL HIDALGO	09016
VALLE DE CHALCO SOLIDARIDAD	15122
LERMA	15051
TLALPAN	09012
XOCHIMILCO	09013
VENUSTIANO CARRANZA	09017
CHALCO	15025
CHIMALHUACAN	15031
ISIDRO FABELA	15038
JILOTZINGO	15046
NEXTLALPAN	15059
LA PAZ	15070
TLALNEPANTLA DE BAZ	15104
CUAUHTEMOC	09015
ECATEPEC DE MORELOS	15033
HUIXQUILUCAN	15037
NAUCALPAN DE JUAREZ	15057
NICOLAS ROMERO	15060
CUAUTITLAN IZCALLI	15121
TECAMAC	15081
IZTAPALAPA	09007
CUAUTITLAN	15024
JALTENCO	15044
MELCHOR OCAMPO	15053
TONANITLA	15125
TULTITLAN	15109
BENITO JUAREZ	09014
CHICOLOAPAN	15029
AZCAPOTZALCO	09002
CUAJIMALPA DE MORELOS	09004
NEZAHUALCOYOTL	15058

Cities and Towns in the area code: 117

Town	INEGI Code
ACOLMAN DE NEZAHUALCOYOTL	150020001
ALVARO OBREGON	090100001
AXOTLAN	151210007
AZCAPOTZALCO	090020001
BENITO JUAREZ	090140001
BOSQUES DE COACALCO	150200038
BUENAVISTA	151090003
CABAÑAS, LAS	150950028
CABI, EL	150830006
CAÑADA, LA	150370043
CEDROS, LOS	090120249
CHALCO DE DIAZ COVARRUBIAS	150250001
CHICOLOAPAN DE JUAREZ	150290001
CHIMALHUACAN	150310001
CIUDAD LOPEZ MATEOS	150130001
CIUDAD NEZAHUALCOYOTL	150580001
COATEPEC	150390004
COCOTITLAN	150220001
COLONIA EL MIRADOR	150600071
CONCEPCION, LA	150600029
COYOACAN	090030001
CUAJIMALPA DE MORELOS	090040001
CUAUHTEMOC	090150001
CUAUTITLAN	150240001
CUAUTITLAN IZCALLI	151210001
ECATEPEC DE MORELOS	150330001
EJIDO DE SAN JUAN TLIHUACAN	150130104
EJIDO EL CAPULIN	150390083
FUENTES DEL VALLE	151090068
GENERAL MANUEL AVILA CAMACHO	150390007
GUSTAVO A. MADERO	090050001
HUIXQUILUCAN DE DEGOLLADO	150370001
IXTAPALUCA	150390001
IZTACALCO	090060001
IZTAPALAPA	090070001
KM. 38	090120129
LAUREL, EL	150370010
LLANO DE LAS FLORES (BARRIO DEL HUESO)	150570258
LOMA DEL RIO	150600063
MAGDALENA CHICHICASPA	150370013
MAGDALENA CONTRERAS, LA	090080001
MELCHOR OCAMPO	150530001
MIGUEL HIDALGO	090160001
NAUCALPAN DE JUAREZ	150370071
NAUCALPAN DE JUAREZ	150570001
OJO DE AGUA	150810019
PARRES (EL GUARDA)	090120019
PEDREGAL, EL	150130105
PROGRESO INDUSTRIAL	150600016
RANCHO COXTITLAN	150290036
RANCHO TLALMIMILOLPAN	150290035
REYES ACAQUILPAN, LOS	150700001
RIO FRIO DE JUAREZ	150390011
SALAZAR	150510015
SAN ANDRES MIXQUIC	090110011
SAN ANTONIO TECOMITL	090090011
SAN BARTOLOME XICOMULCO	090090015
SAN FRANCISCO ACUAUTLA	150390012
SAN FRANCISCO CHIMALPA	150570088
SAN FRANCISCO COACALCO	150200001
SAN FRANCISCO MAGU	150600018
SAN FRANCISCO TECOXPA	090090017
SAN GREGORIO CUAUTZINGO	150250005
SAN JACINTO	150370022
SAN JOSE EL VIDRIO	150600020
SAN JOSE TEJAMANIL	150570239
SAN JUAN DE LAS TABLAS	150600021
SAN JUAN IXTAYOPAN	090110021
SAN LORENZO ACOPILCO	090040020
SAN LORENZO TLACOYUCAN	090090152
SAN LUIS AYUCAN	150460003
SAN MARTIN CUAUTLALPAN	150250014
SAN MATEO HUITZILZINGO	150250016
SAN MATEO IXTACALCO	150240088
SAN MIGUEL AJUSCO	090120026
SAN MIGUEL TOPILEJO	090120027
SAN NICOLAS TETELCO	090110024
SAN PABLO ATLAZALPAN	150250019
SAN PABLO DE LAS SALINAS	151090025
SAN PABLO OZTOTEPEC	090090024
SAN PEDRO ATOCPAN	090090029
SANTA ANA JILOTZINGO	150460001
SANTA ANA NEXTLALPAN	150590001
SANTA ANA TLACOTENCO	090090036
SANTA CATARINA AYOTZINGO	150250020
SANTA CATARINA YECAHUITZOTL	090110026
SANTA CRUZ	151220005
SANTA CRUZ AYOTUZCO	150370024
SANTA MARIA MAGDALENA CAHUACAN	150600004
SANTA MARIA MAZATLA	150460005
SANTA MARIA TONANITLA	150440002
SANTIAGO CUAUTLALPAN	150950026
SANTIAGO YANCUITLALPAN	150370025
SAYAVEDRA (FINCAS DE SAYAVEDRA)	150130108
TECAMAC DE FELIPE VILLANUEVA	150810001
TEMAMATLA	150830001
TENOPALCO (SAN FRANCISCO TENOPALCO)	150530005
TEPEPAN	090130131
TEPOJACO	151210067
TEPOTZOTLAN	150950001
TLACHIULTEPEC DE AHUAYUCAN (LAS MALVINAS)	090130137
TLAHUAC	090110001
TLALNEPANTLA	151040001
TLALPAN	090120001
TLAZALA DE FABELA	150380001
TRANSFIGURACION	150600025
TULTEPEC	151080001
TULTITLAN DE MARIANO ESCOBEDO	151090001
VENUSTIANO CARRANZA	090170001
VILLA ALPINA	150570149
VILLA MILPA ALTA	090090001
VILLA NICOLAS ROMERO	150600001
VISITACION	150530028
XICO	151220001
XOCHIMILCO	090130001
ZACAMULPA	150370026
ZOQUIAPAN	150390017

Companies providing phone service in the area code: 53

Company
ALESTRA
ALTÁN
ALTATA
AT&T
AT&T
AT&T
AVANTEL
AXTEL
BESTPHONE
BRIHMCA
CABLECOM
CABLEMAS
CABLEVISION
COMUNICALO
CONVERGIA
DIALOGA
EJA
FREEDOMPOP
GPO HIDALGUENSE
IBO CELL
IENTC
INBTEL
INTERFIBRA
IP MATRIX
KIWI NETWORKS
LANTOINTERNET
LOGITEL
MARCATELCOM
MAXCOM
MCM
MEGA TEL
MEGACABLE
METRORED
MOVISTAR
NEUS
OPENIP
PROTEL I-NEXT
QBOCEL
QUALTEL
SERVITRON
SERVNET
TACTIC
TALKTEL
TELCEL
TELECOMMERCE
TELECOMUNICACIONES 360
TELEFACIL
TELMEX
TOTAL PLAY
TV REY
UC TELECOM
VADSA
VPN

Local Number: 7 Digits

From	To a Landline	To a Cell Phone (Caller paid CPP)	To a Cell Phone (Receiver paid MPP)
Landline (Local dialing)	56 + 8 digits	56 + 8 digits	56 + 8 digits
Cell (Local dialing)	56 + 8 digits	56 + 8 digits	56 + 8 digits
Landline (Long distance)	56 + 8 digits	56 + 8 digits	56 + 8 digits
Cell (Long distance)	56 + 8 digits	56 + 8 digits	56 + 8 digits

International dialing: +52 + 56 + 8 digits
