= Asociación Mexicana de Cineastas Independientes =

AMCI (Mexico)
- Motto: Vive la Experiencia de Estudiar Cine
- Motto in English: Live the Experience of Studying Filmmaking
- Type: Private School
- Established: 1993
- Rector: Pedro Araneda Vázquez (Since 1993)
- Location: Mexico City, Federal District, Mexico; 19.3366°N 99.1929°W
- Campus: Urban
- Colors: amethyst and white
- Website: www.amci.edu.mx

The “Asociación Mexicana de Cineastas Independientes. AMCI”, Spanish for Mexican Association of Independent Filmmakers is the first private film school in Mexico. The association produces almost 150 short films a year, many showing at international festivals.

== History ==
It was founded on 1993 by Pedro Araneda, a producer, director and scriptwriter born in Mexico City and graduated from New York University. AMCI has grown since to become a recognized university with strong presence in the industry. Its campus was originally built on the Magdalena Contreras borough. However, it was then moved to a new location neighboring UNAM, the biggest public university in Latin America.

The university and association aims not only to provide a comprehensive theoretical and practical cinema education, but also to exist as a business-related social networking environment and community for its students, faculty members and staff.

== Academic offerings ==
=== Accredited Programs ===
The university currently offers a bachelor program on Film and Television and a five semester associate degree, both combining an array of disciplines that varies from narrative aspects of the medium, technical knowledge and the business of film production. It also has a Master's degree on Film Creation, programs that are specialized on scriptwriting, direction and cinematography. AMCI is an accredited institution by SEP in Mexico.

Short Term Non-Degree Programs

- 12 Month Intensive Filmmaking Program
- 18 Month Intensive Acting Program

=== Workshops ===
Hands-on intensive workshops

- 3 Week Summer Camp for Teens
- 1 Week Hollywood Production Workshop

Online Certificate Programs and Courses

- 1 Week AMCI Master Class on Filmmaking
- 7 Month Certificates on Filmmaking, Acting, Film Business, Locution and Dubbing, Writing for Film and TV Series and Photography
- 2 Month Courses on Filmmaking Production, Film Development, Film Distribution and Exhibition, Copyright, Locution Principles, The Power of the Voice, Dramaturgy for Audiovisual Media, Audiovisual Content and Audiences, and TV Series Development.
