= Cerro del Judío =

Mountain in Magdalena Contreras, Mexico City, Mexico

- Location within Mexico

Highest point
- Elevation: 2,750 m (9,020 ft)
- Coordinates: 19°19′16.75″N 99°15′14.65″W

Geography
- Location: Mexico City, Mexico

Cerro del Judío, also known as Cerro de las Tres Cruces, or "Mazatepetl" (Cerro de los Venados) is a mountain located in Magdalena Contreras municipality of Mexico City.

At the top of this hill, at 2750 meters above sea level, an Otomí archaeological settlement, consisting of a pyramid dating from 1200 is located here. This pyramid has a staircase that has a turtle with jaguar claws carved in stone.

There is a ceremonial center there with other archaeological pieces dating from 1200 to 1380 A.D. The INAH began the recovery of this space, which was in charge of the archaeologist Francisco Rivas in the year 2000 and was named Lomas de Padierna National Park. Rivas points out that the builders are likely to be tepanecs, a group that lived in the area at the time of the Triple Alliance, formed by Tlacopan, Texcoco and Azcapotzalco.

As for the name, "Cerro del Judío" there are several versions, however, the oldest known name is that of "Mazatepetl", Cerro de los Venados.

Every year in Holy Week the neighbors gather for the Christian holidays, since three crosses have been placed on the cusp. The sacrifice of Christ is celebrated and Saint Barnabas, the patron of the people, which has an area of 383.49 hectares.

The Cerro de Mazatepetl is considered a protected Natural Area, as agreed between the Magdalena Contreras delegation and the Natural Resources Commission.
