= Jhonatan Jardines Fraire =

Mexican politician

- Born: 23 October 1980 (age 45); Mexico City, Mexico
- Occupation: Deputy
- Political party: PRD

Jhonatan Jardines Fraire (born 23 October 1980) is a Mexican politician affiliated with the PRD. In 2012–2015 he served as a federal deputy in the 62nd Congress, representing the Federal District's sixth district.
