= San Jerónimo Lídice =

Coordinates: 19°20′N 99°13′W

Location with respect to Central Mexico City

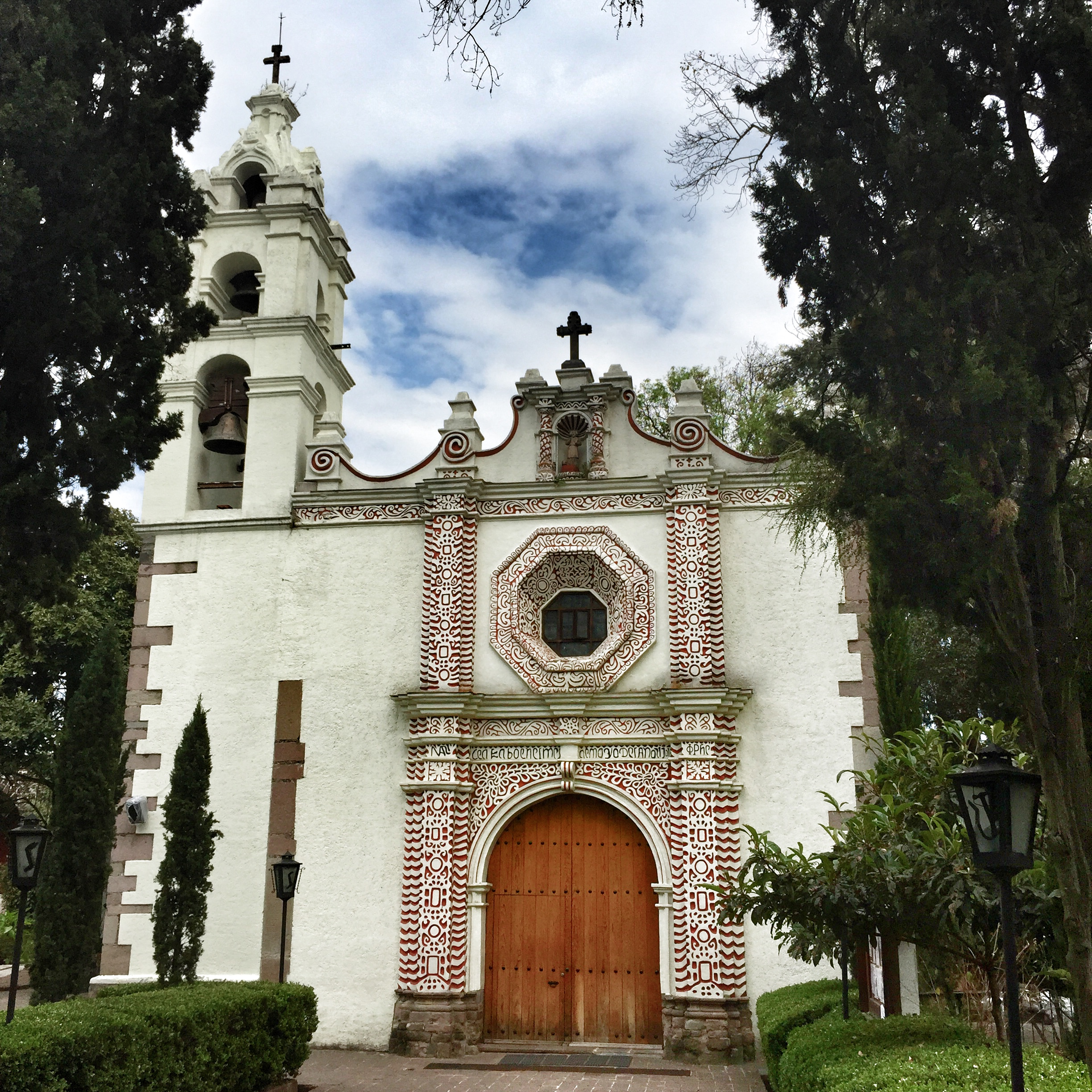
Church of San Jerónimo Aculco

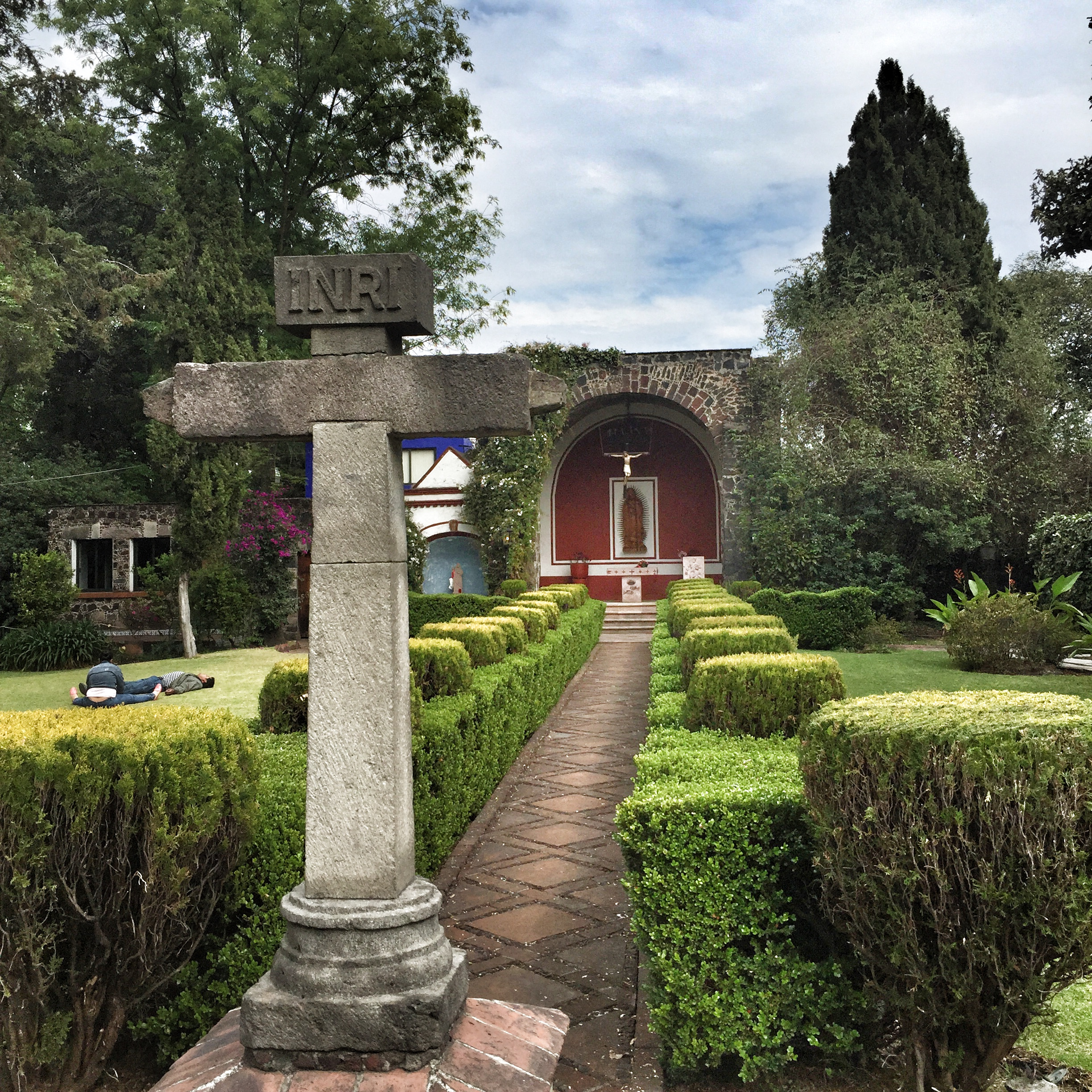
Garden and open chapel, Church of San Jerónimo Aculco

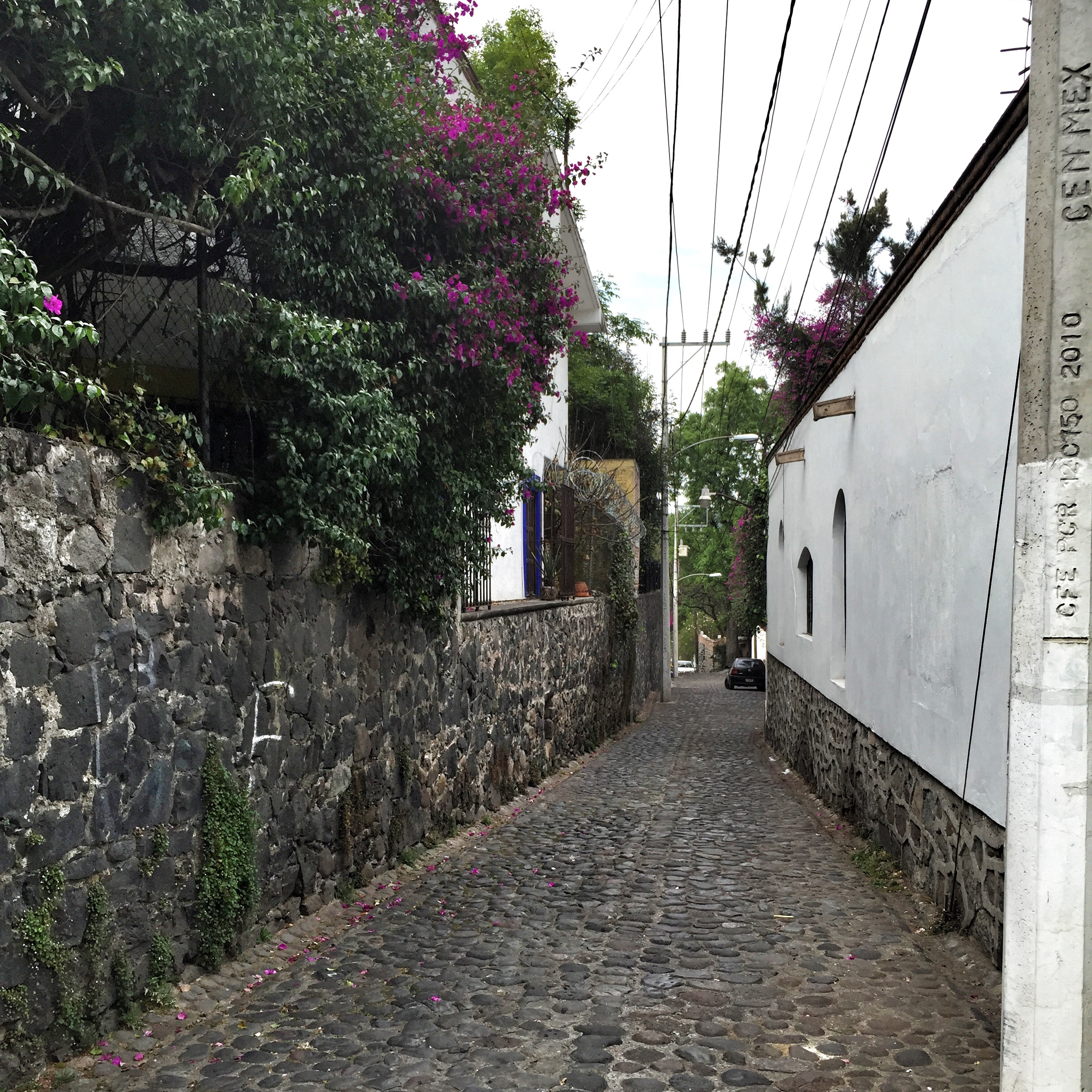
Street in San Jerónimo Lídice

San Jerónimo Lídice, or San Jerónimo Aculco, is a former village now part of Mexico City in the Magdalena Contreras borough in the southwest of the city.

A settlement on this spot, Aculco, dates back to Toltec times; its name means "where the water turns". The village specialized in fruit and vegetable production. When a dam in the area was built in 1934, Toltec remains were found, including the slope of a pyramid.

The church of San Jerónimo Aculco dates from the 16th century, when it was founded by Franciscans. An open chapel remains. The church was modified in the 18th century. It celebrates its patron saint's day on September 30.

In 1943, part of the village changed its name in commemoration of the massacre at Lidice in what is now the Czech Republic. Each year on June 10, the Lidice massacre is commemorated in the square in front of San Jerónimo Church.
