= Colegio Williams =

Private school system in Mexico City

Coordinates: 19.2208°N 99.1957°W

Colegio Williams ("Williams College") is a private school system in Mexico City, serving preschool through high school (senior high school). It has three campuses: Campus Mixcoac in Mixcoac, Benito Juárez; Campus San Jerónimo in San Jerónimo Lídice, Magdalena Contreras, and Campus Ajusco in San Miguel Ajusco, Tlalpan. Its head office is in the Mixcoac campus.

It was founded in 1899 by British educator Camilo John Williams. Originally based in the area of Tacubaya (very close to its current location). It was at first an all-day school, including a boarding house. The school's curriculum was entirely in English; even Roman Catholic events were held in English. It was considered the best school in Mexico for several years mainly due to its high level of English. Recognised as the first school in Mexico and Latin America having English as an actual subject.

Around 1904-1905, the school moved to its current location, to what used to be the summer house of José Yves Limantour the Finance Minister of President Porfirio Díaz. This summer house is built in Victorian British style, emulating a small castle in the Scottish Highlands. Mr. Williams was by that time an influential person in the educational board, established by Justo Sierra.

When Camilo died, the school was taken over by his eldest son John A. Williams (Mr. Johnny). During this phase, the school lived through its "Golden Years", obtaining prestigious awards in matters of education, and even being recognized outside Mexico by the Philadelphia City Council board of schools. After Mr. Johnny's death his son Carlos J. Williams became Principal followed by Mr. Johnny's brother Charles. Though this period didn't last long, the importance of their work was the school's transformation process from being all-boys to becoming co-educational, the elimination of the boarding house and school and extending the curriculum to the preparatory school levels. After Charles' death, his son Arturo C. Williams became the new principal. He remains the Principal until today. He has faced tough times at the school: the reduction of the school grounds (it at first occupied a whole block of the area, right now is just a third part of what it was in that time; ancient parts of the school are now being used by Telmex and a Comercial Mexicana supermarket), the construction of the Mixcoac Mexico City metro station in front of the school, the increase of the delinquency around the Mixcoac area, and the struggling with other Anglo schools. As a solution of the reduction of the original school area, he established 2 more campuses: one with a new elementary school and the kindergarten in the southern part of the city in San Jeronimo in the Magdalena Contreras borough, and a didactic farm and sporting grounds in the Tlalpan borough, near Mount Ajusco.

The school offers the IBO international education programme.
