= Nelly Campos =

Mexican politician

- Born: 1 January 1967 (age 59); Mexico City, Mexico
- Occupation: Politician
- Political party: PAN

Nelly Campos Quiroz (born 1 January 1967) is a Mexican politician from the National Action Party (PAN). From 2000 to 2003 she served as a federal deputy in the 58th Congress, representing the Federal District's sixth electoral district.
