= 6th federal electoral district of Mexico City =

Federal electoral district of Mexico

Mexico City's 6th
- Electoral district of the Chamber of Deputies of Mexico

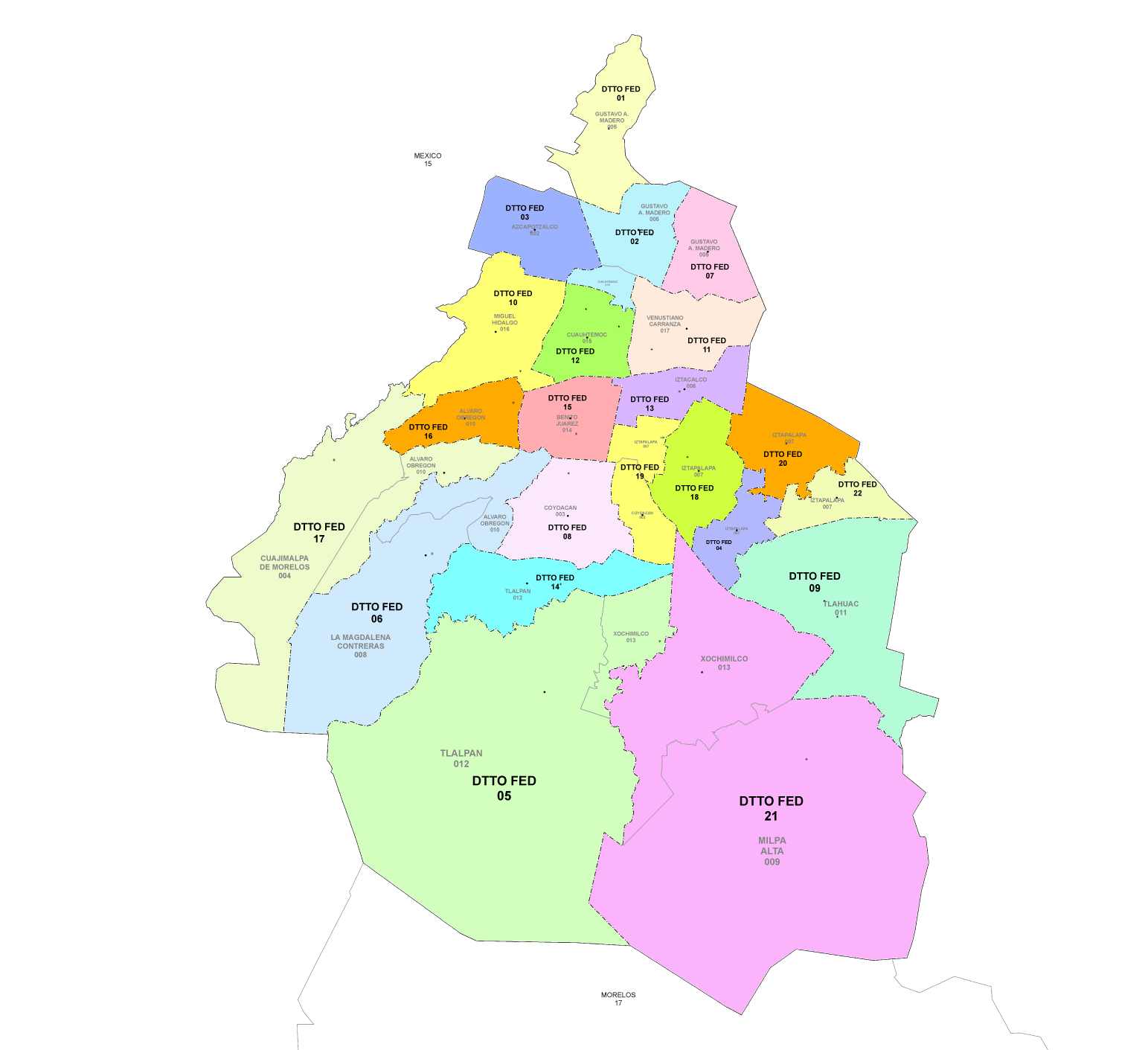
- 6th district since 2023

Incumbent
- Member: Daniel Campos Plancarte
- Party: ▌Morena
- Congress: 66th (2024–2027)

District
- State: Mexico City
- Head town: Magdalena Contreras
- Coordinates: 19°20′00″N 99°12′50″W
- Covers: Magdalena Contreras, Álvaro Obregón (part)
- PR region: Fourth
- Precincts: 255
- Population: 414,512 (2020 census)

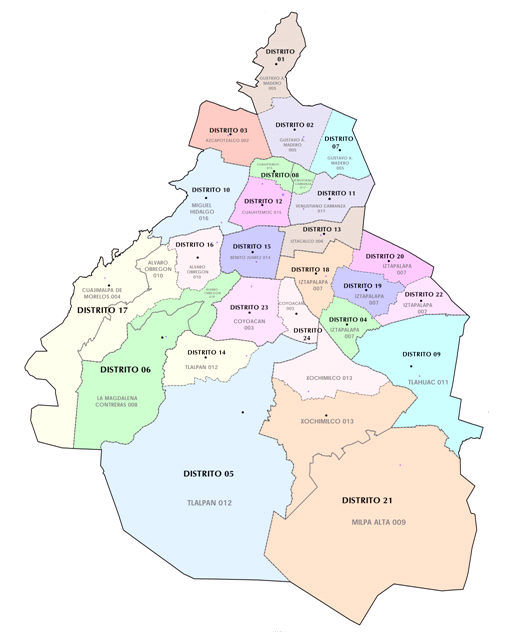
Mexico City under the 2017–2022 districting plan

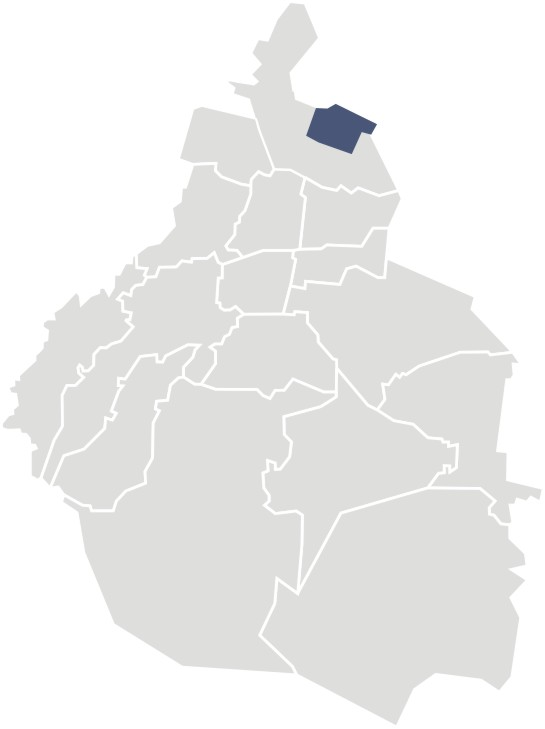
6th district in 2005–2017

The 6th federal electoral district of Mexico City (Spanish: Distrito electoral federal 06 de la Ciudad de México; previously "of the Federal District") is one of the 300 electoral districts into which Mexico is divided for elections to the federal Chamber of Deputies and one of 22 such districts in Mexico City.

It elects one deputy to the lower house of Congress for each three-year legislative session by means of the first-past-the-post system. Votes cast in the district also count towards the calculation of proportional representation ("plurinominal") deputies elected from the fourth region.

The current member for the district, elected in the 2024 general election, is Daniel Campos Plancarte of the National Regeneration Movement (Morena).

== District territory ==
Under the 2023 districting plan adopted by the National Electoral Institute (INE), which is to be used for the 2024, 2027 and 2030 federal elections, the 6th district covers the whole of the borough (alcaldía) of Magdalena Contreras and the eastern, more urban part of Álvaro Obregón, for a total of 255 electoral precincts (secciones electorales).

The district reported a population of 414,512 in the 2020 census.

== Previous districting schemes ==
Evolution of electoral district numbers
	1974	1978	1996	2005	2017	2023
Mexico City (Federal District)	27	40	30	27	24	22
Chamber of Deputies	196	300				

2017–2022

From 2017 to 2022, the district covered Magdalena Contreras and a portion of Álvaro Obregón.

2005–2017

Under the 2005 districting scheme, the district covered a roughly rectangular area in the north-east of the borough (delegación) of Gustavo A. Madero, at the other end of the city.

1996–2005

Between 1996 and 2005, the district was in the east of Gustavo A. Madero.

1978–1996

The districting scheme in force from 1978 to 1996 was the result of the 1977 electoral reforms, which increased the number of single-member seats in the Chamber of Deputies from 196 to 300. Under that plan, the Federal District's seat allocation rose from 27 to 40. The 6th district covered a portion of the borough of Cuauhtémoc in the city centre.

== Deputies returned to Congress ==
(Mexico) National parties
- Current
- PAN
- PRI
- PT
- PVEM
- MC
- Morena
- PAZ
- Somos
- Defunct or local only
- PLM
- PNR
- PRM
- PNM
- PP
- PPS
- PARM
- PFCRN
- CON
- PANAL
- PSD
- PES
- PES
- PRD

Mexico City's 6th district
Election	Deputy	Party	Term	Legislature
1916	Rafael Martínez de Escobar		1916–1917	Constituent Congress of Querétaro
1917	Rafael Martínez de Escobar	Derechista	1917–1918	27th Congress
1918	Miguel Gómez Noriega	PLN	1918–1920	28th Congress
1920	Rafael Ramos Pedrueza		1920–1922	29th Congress
1922	Martín Luis Guzmán		1922–1924	30th Congress
1924; 1926	Gonzalo González		1924–1928	31st Congress; 32nd Congress
1928	Enrique Medina	CI	1928–1930	33rd Congress
1930	José Pérez Gil y Ortiz	Institutional Revolutionary Party	1930–1932	34th Congress
1932	Lamberto Ortega	Institutional Revolutionary Party	1932–1934	35th Congress
1934	Carlos F. Osuna	Institutional Revolutionary Party	1934–1937	36th Congress
1937	Francisco Martínez Vázquez		1937–1940	37th Congress
1940	César M. Cervantes	Institutional Revolutionary Party	1940–1943	38th Congress
1943	Juan Best García	Institutional Revolutionary Party	1943–1946	39th Congress
1946	César M. Cervantes	Institutional Revolutionary Party	1946–1949	40th Congress
1949	Gabriel García Rojas	Institutional Revolutionary Party	1949–1952	41st Congress
1952	Narciso Contreras Contreras	Institutional Revolutionary Party	1952–1955	42nd Congress
1955	Baltasar Dromundo Chorné	Institutional Revolutionary Party	1955–1958	43rd Congress
1958	Martha Andrade de Del Rosal	Institutional Revolutionary Party	1958–1961	44th Congress
1961	Rodolfo Echeverría Álvarez	Institutional Revolutionary Party	1961–1964	45th Congress
1964	Luis Ignacio Santibáñez Patiño	Institutional Revolutionary Party	1964–1967	46th Congress
1967	Ignacio Castillo Mena	Institutional Revolutionary Party	1967–1970	47th Congress
1970	Jorge Baeza Rodríguez	Institutional Revolutionary Party	1970–1973	48th Congress
1973	Concepción Rivera Centeno	Institutional Revolutionary Party	1973–1976	49th Congress
1976	Alfonso Rodríguez Rivera	Institutional Revolutionary Party	1976–1979	50th Congress
1979	Daniel Mejía Colín	Institutional Revolutionary Party	1979–1982	51st Congress
1982	Venustiano Reyes López	Institutional Revolutionary Party	1982–1985	52nd Congress
1985	José Herrera Arango	Institutional Revolutionary Party	1985–1988	53rd Congress
1988	Sara Villalpando Núñez	Institutional Revolutionary Party	1988–1991	54th Congress
1991	Marco Antonio Fajardo Martínez	Institutional Revolutionary Party	1991–1994	55th Congress
1994	Claudia Esqueda Llanes	Institutional Revolutionary Party	1994–1997	56th Congress
1997	Gonzalo Pedro Bárbaro Rojas Arreola	Party of the Democratic Revolution	1997–2000	57th Congress
2000	Nelly Campos Quiroz	National Action Party (Mexico)	2000–2003	58th Congress
2003	Edgar Torres Baltazar	Party of the Democratic Revolution	2003–2006	59th Congress
2006	María Elena Torres Baltazar	Party of the Democratic Revolution	2006–2009	60th Congress
2009	Roberto Rebollo Vivero	Institutional Revolutionary Party	2009–2012	61st Congress
2012	Jhonatan Jardines Fraire	Party of the Democratic Revolution	2012–2015	62nd Congress
2015	Jesús Emiliano Álvarez López	National Regeneration Movement	2015–2018	63rd Congress
2018	Sergio Mayer Bretón	National Regeneration Movement	2018–2021	64th Congress
2021	Diana Lara Carreón	National Action Party (Mexico)	2021–2024	65th Congress
2024	Daniel Campos Plancarte	National Regeneration Movement	2024–2027	66th Congress

== Presidential elections ==
Mexico City's 6th district
Election	District won by	Party or coalition	%
2018	Andrés Manuel López Obrador	Juntos Haremos Historia	54.1016
2024	Claudia Sheinbaum Pardo	Sigamos Haciendo Historia	50.4560
