= María Elena Torres Baltazar =

Mexican politician

- Born: 23 October 1961 (age 64); Mexico City, Mexico
- Occupation: Politician
- Political party: PRD

María Elena Torres Baltazar (born 23 October 1961) is a Mexican politician affiliated with the Party of the Democratic Revolution. In 2006–2009 she served as a federal deputy in the 60th Congress, representing the Federal District's sixth district.
