= Roberto Rebollo Vivero =

Mexican politician

- Born: 2 February 1957 (age 69); Mexico City, Mexico
- Occupation: Politician
- Political party: PRI

Roberto Rebollo Vivero (born 2 February 1957) is a Mexican politician from the Institutional Revolutionary Party. From 2009 to 2012 he served as a federal deputy in the 61st Congress, representing the Federal District's sixth district.
