= Magdalena Contreras =

- Borough
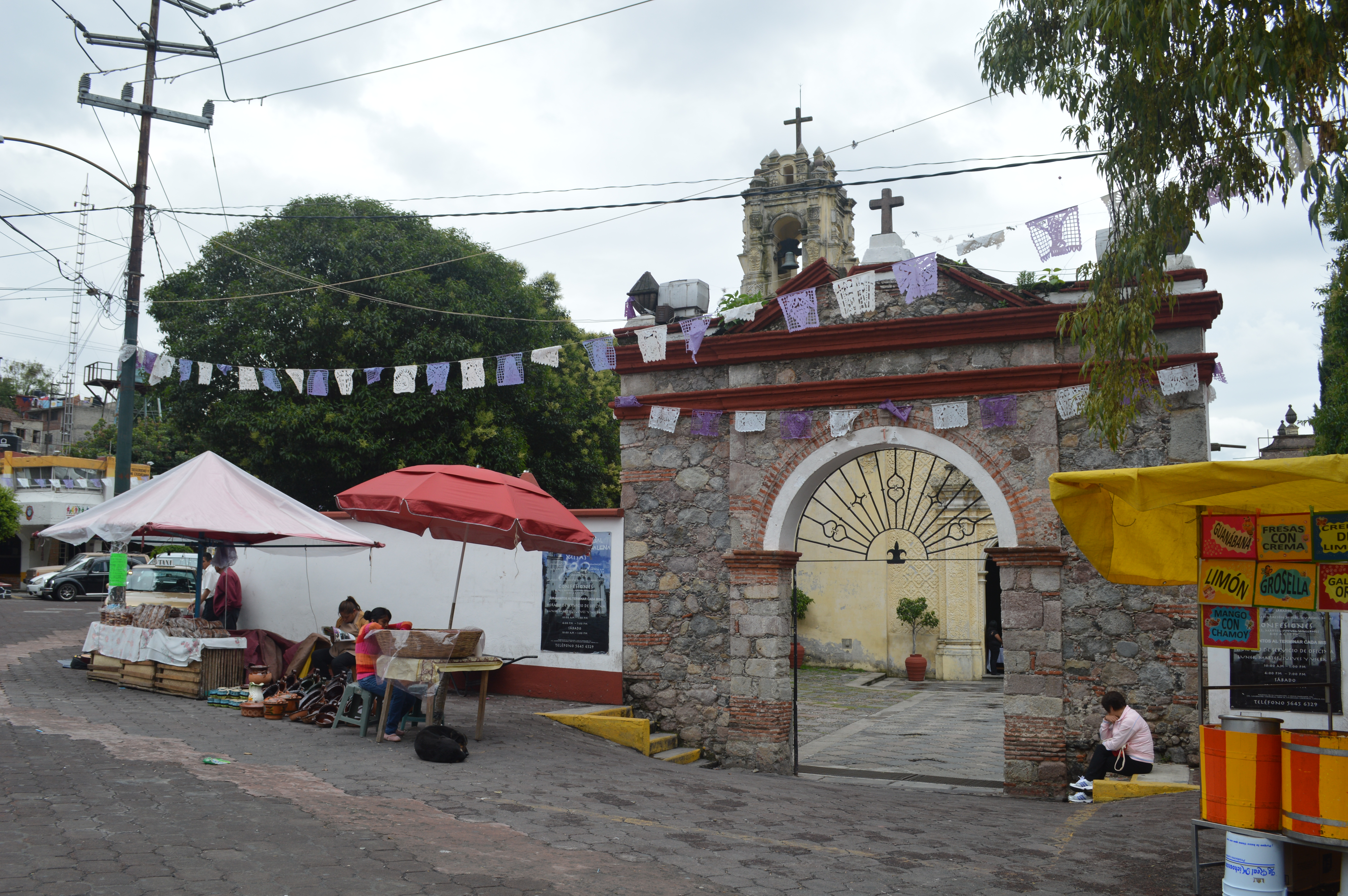
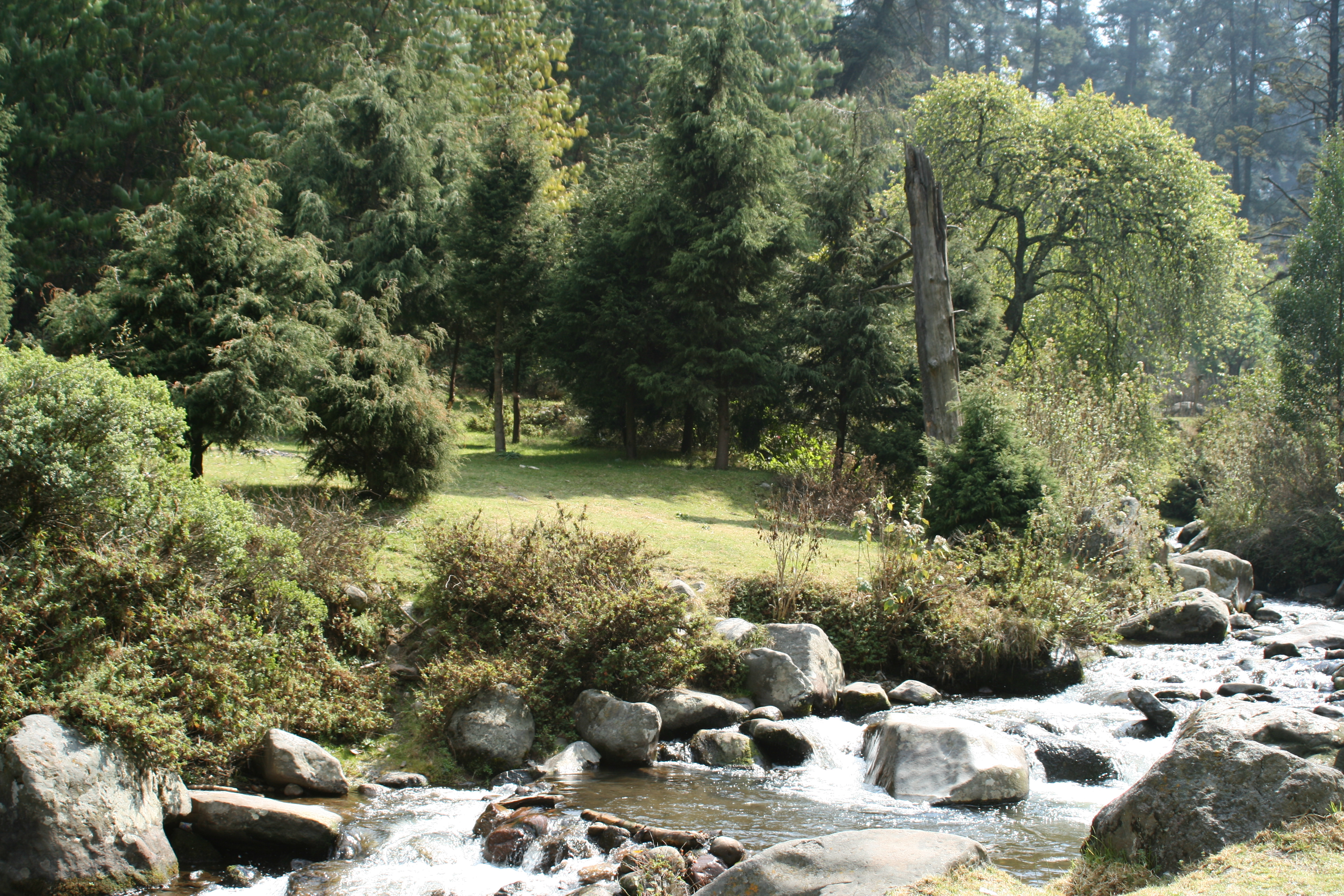
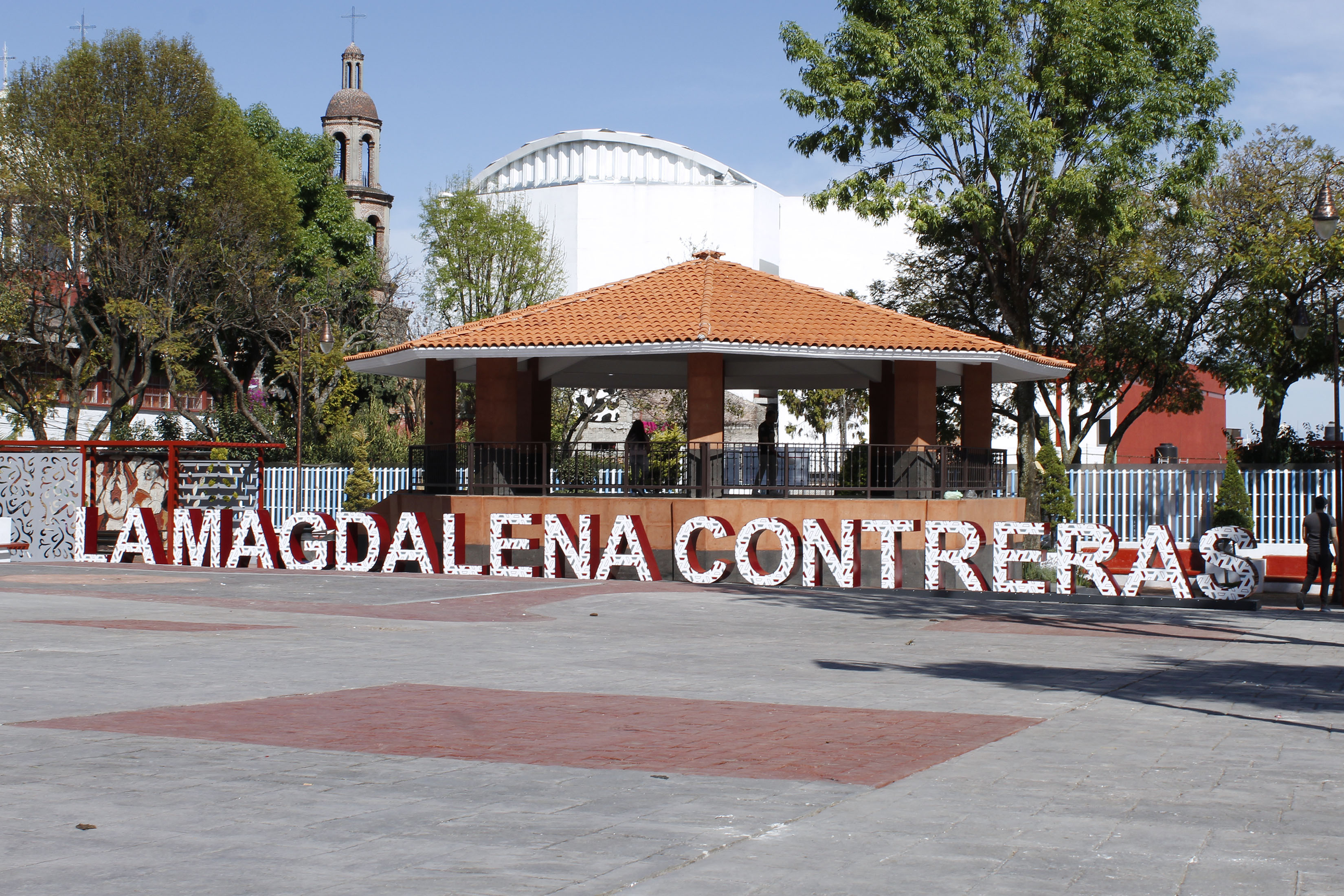
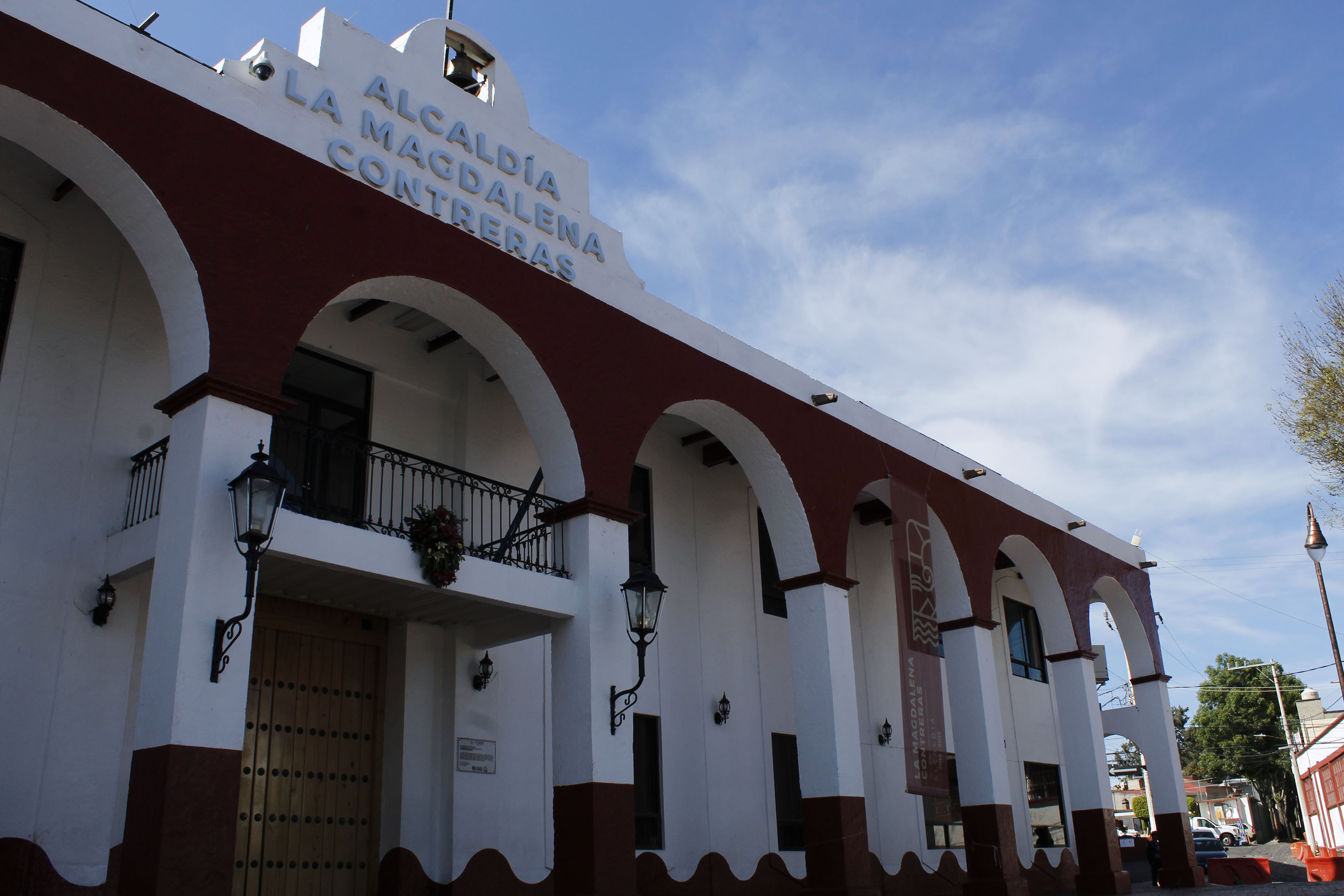
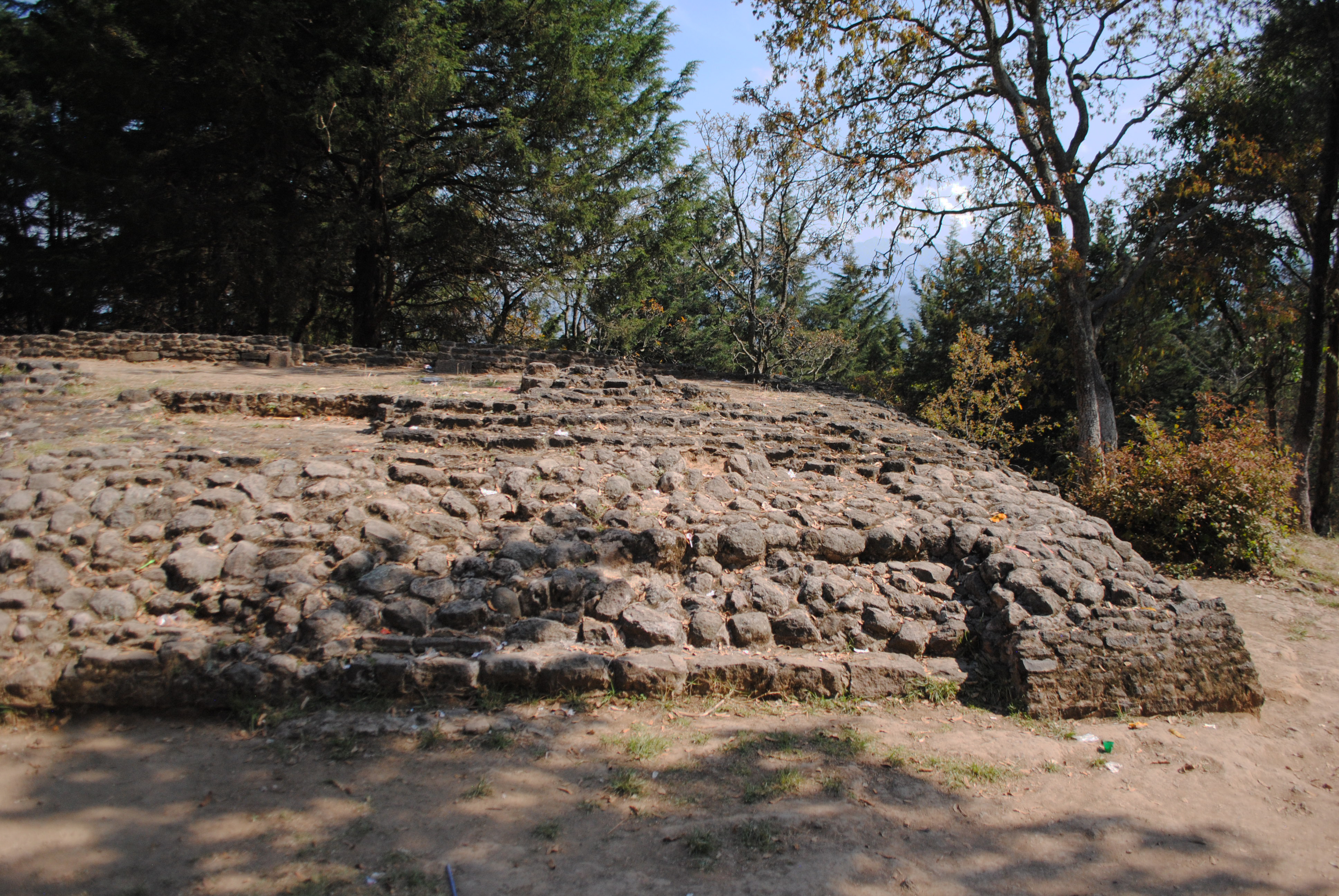
- Top:Magdalena Atlitic Church; Middle: Los Dinamos Forest, Magdalena Contreras main plaza; Bottom: Magdalena Contreras Borough Palace, Mazatépetl Archaeological Zone

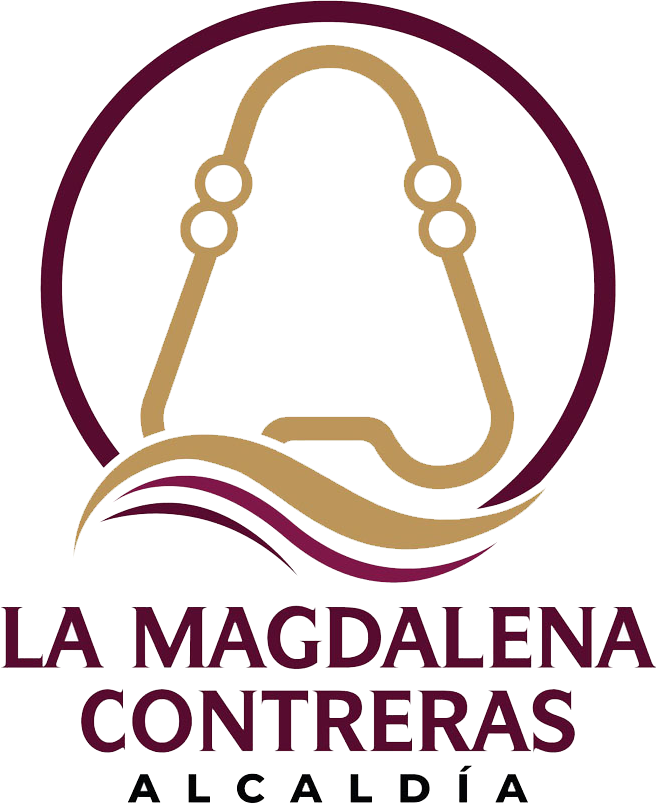
- Seal Logo

- Magdalena Contreras within Mexico City Alcaldía Magdalena Contreras logo.png
- Coordinates: 19°20′00″N 99°12′50″W
- Country: Mexico
- Federal entity: Mexico City
- Established: 1927
- Named for: Santa María Magdalena
- Seat: Av. Álvaro Obregón 20, Barranca Seca

Government
  - Mayor: Fernando Mercado Guaida (MORENA)
  - Federal electoral district: CDMX-06

Area
  - Total: 74.58 km^{2} (28.80 sq mi)

Population (2020)
  - Total: 247,622
  - Density: 3,320/km^{2} (8,599/sq mi)
- Time zone: UTC-6 (Zona Centro)
- Postal codes: 10000-10999
- Area code: 55
- HDI (2020): ▼0.787 Very High

La Magdalena Contreras (Spanish pronunciation: [maɣðaˈlena konˈtɾeɾas]) is a borough (demarcación territorial) in Mexico City. As of the 2010 census, it has a population of 239,086 inhabitants and is the third-least populous of Mexico City's boroughs. It lies at an elevation of 2,365 m (7,759 ft) above sea level. It is named after two historically important communities—La Magdalena Atlitic and Colonia Contreras. The northern end of the borough is urbanized. The rest of Magdalena Contreras, with its mountains and ravines, is designated as a conservation zone. However, urban sprawl has put pressure on these conservation areas. In an effort to preserve the area's forests and natural resources, the borough government has started promoting ecotourism.

== History ==
The borough takes its name from the La Magdalena Atlitic, one of four communities with pre-Hispanic roots, and the Contreras neighborhood, an area noted for its textile mills until the 20th century.

Human settlements in the area date to between c. 500 – c. 200 BCE, or the latter Preclassic period. These settlements were mostly located in the Contreras area and were under the control of Cuicuilco . After Cuicuilco was destroyed by an eruption of the Xitle volcano, inhabitants fled to higher elevations. The higher elevations were inhabited by the Otomi or the Chichimeca who were hunter-gatherers that lived in a stateless society. These peoples existed alongside the Nahuatlaca. The Tepanec eventually came to dominate the area, making it part of the Coyoacán dominion. With the rise of the Aztec, the Tepanec were conquered and the area was renamed Atlitic—stone that drinks water—after a large rock which rose above a small lake. Four settlements date from the pre-Hispanic period, San Bernabé Ocotepec, San Nicolás Totolapan, La Magdalena Atlitic and San Jeronimo Aculco.

After the Spanish conquest of the Aztec Empire, the Dominicans established a town and church dedicated to Mary Magdalene and changed the name of the area to Magdalena (de) Atlitic. The first to take advantage of the waters of the Río Magdalena, Jerónimo de León established the first water-powered saw mill in 1543. In the 17th century the Contreras family established a factory in the location that bears their name. At the end of the 18th century, a group of Spanish industrialists founded a textile factory which caused an increase in the economy and the population of the area. By the end of the 19th century, the river was powering four textile factories named El Águila Mexicana, Tizapán, Santa Teresa, and Loreto. These factories produced wool, cotton and cashmere thread, and cloth of various types and by the end of the century had the use of the Mexico City–Cuernavaca rail line for shipping. However, from the colonial period through most of the 19th century, the area was mostly populated by farm and textile laborers who lived in poor conditions.

The modern borough was a result of several reorganizations of the Federal District of Mexico City at the beginning of the 20th century. Initially the area was governed by a municipality system, but then by presidential decree in 1928 the municipality was abolished and it became one of the boroughs of Mexico City.

At the beginning of the 20th century, there was a political power struggle as part of the Mexican Revolution. The "Club Democrático Antireelectionista Vicente Guerrero" formed in 1911 to fight against the power of local strongmen.

The Mexico City–Cuernavaca rail line continued to operate through most of the 20th century with train "501" noted for carrying famous passengers between the two destinations. The line was officially shut down in 1997. The Contreras station was converted into a park.

The latter 20th century is marked by population growth, especially in the borough's north end. In 1963, an extension of the Anillo Periférico ring road was constructed through the borough. The road brought people and prompted the development of housing projects in the 1970s for the city's growing population. These developments include Santa Teresa, Pedregal II, Pueblo Nuevo, Potrerillo, El Rosal, El Tanque, and El Toro, heading west from the roadway.

In 1900, the area was completely rural, with a population of only 8,150 people mostly located in the town of La Magdalena. The borough's population began growing quickly in the 1940s to over 40,000 in 1960, but by 1990 the population had reached over 195,000. Population growth continues but at a slower pace: 222,000 by 2000 and 229,000 in 2005. There is limited space for housing projects due to the geography of the area but population growth has prompted illegal settlements in conservation areas and in steep ravines where landslides are a danger.

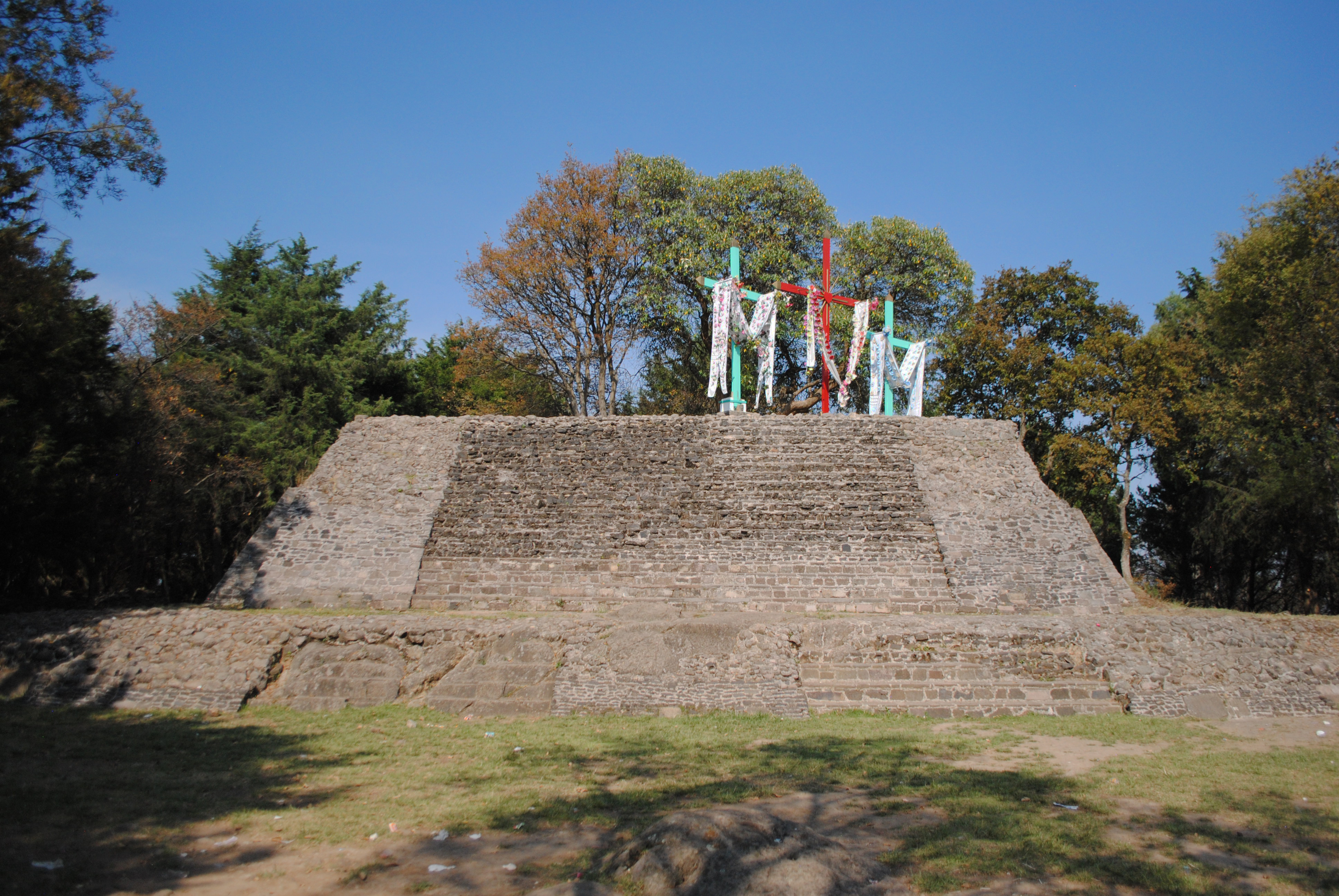
Archaeological area of the Cerro del Judío or Mazatépetl in Ejido San Bernabe Ocotepec

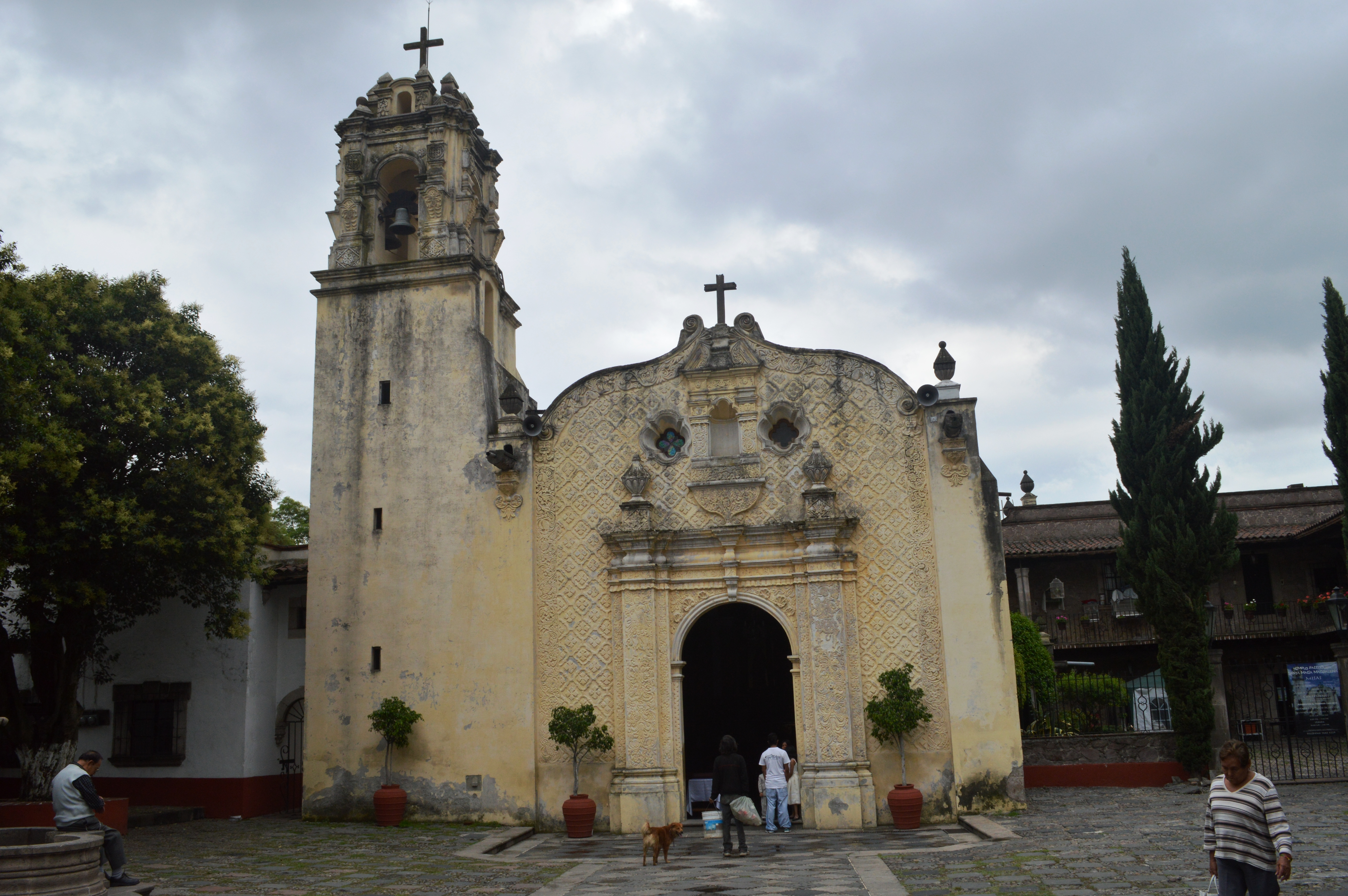
Magdalena Atlitic Church

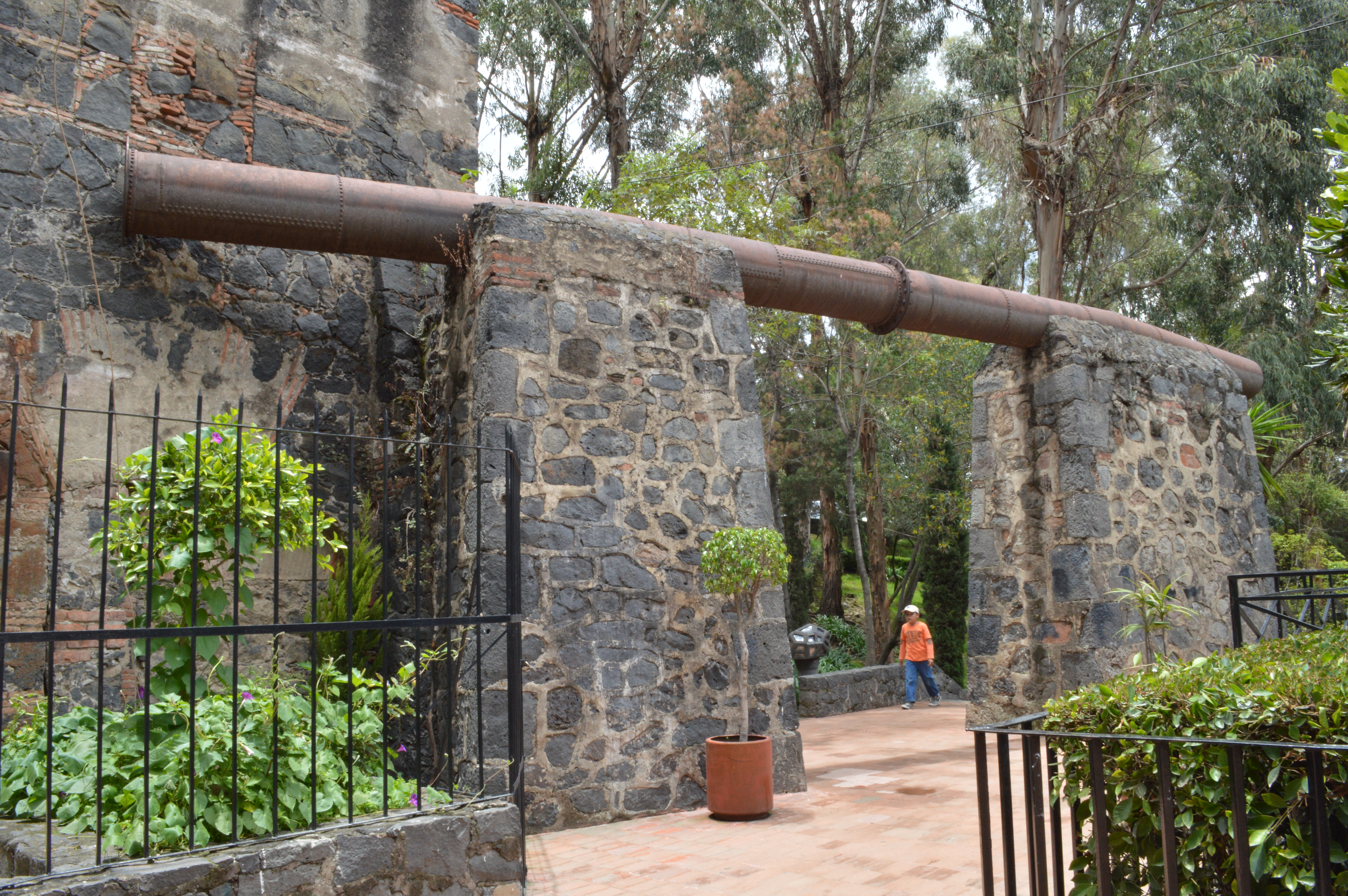
Ruins of the El Águila textile mill

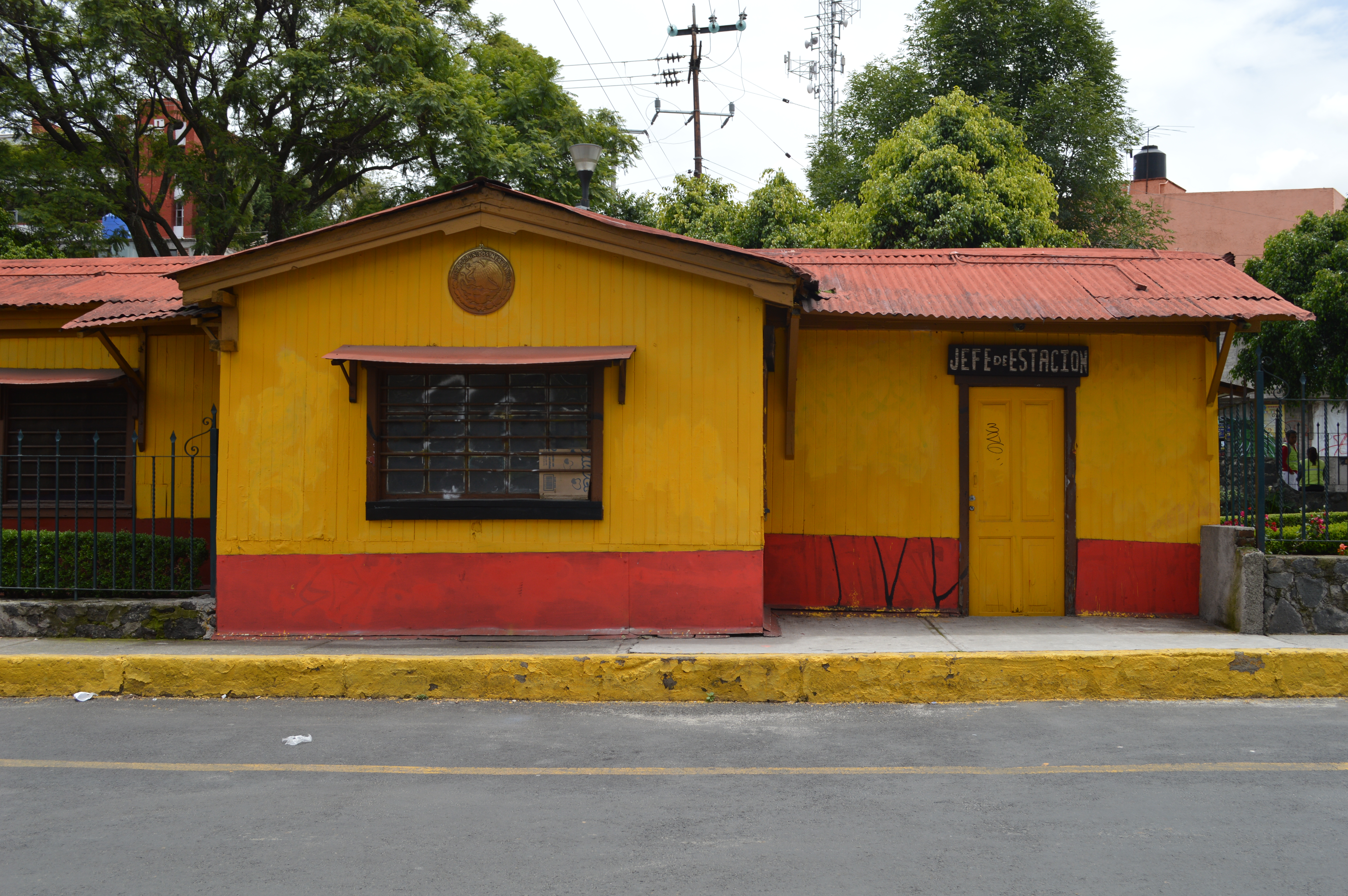
Old station of the Mexico City–Cuernavaca line

== Geography ==
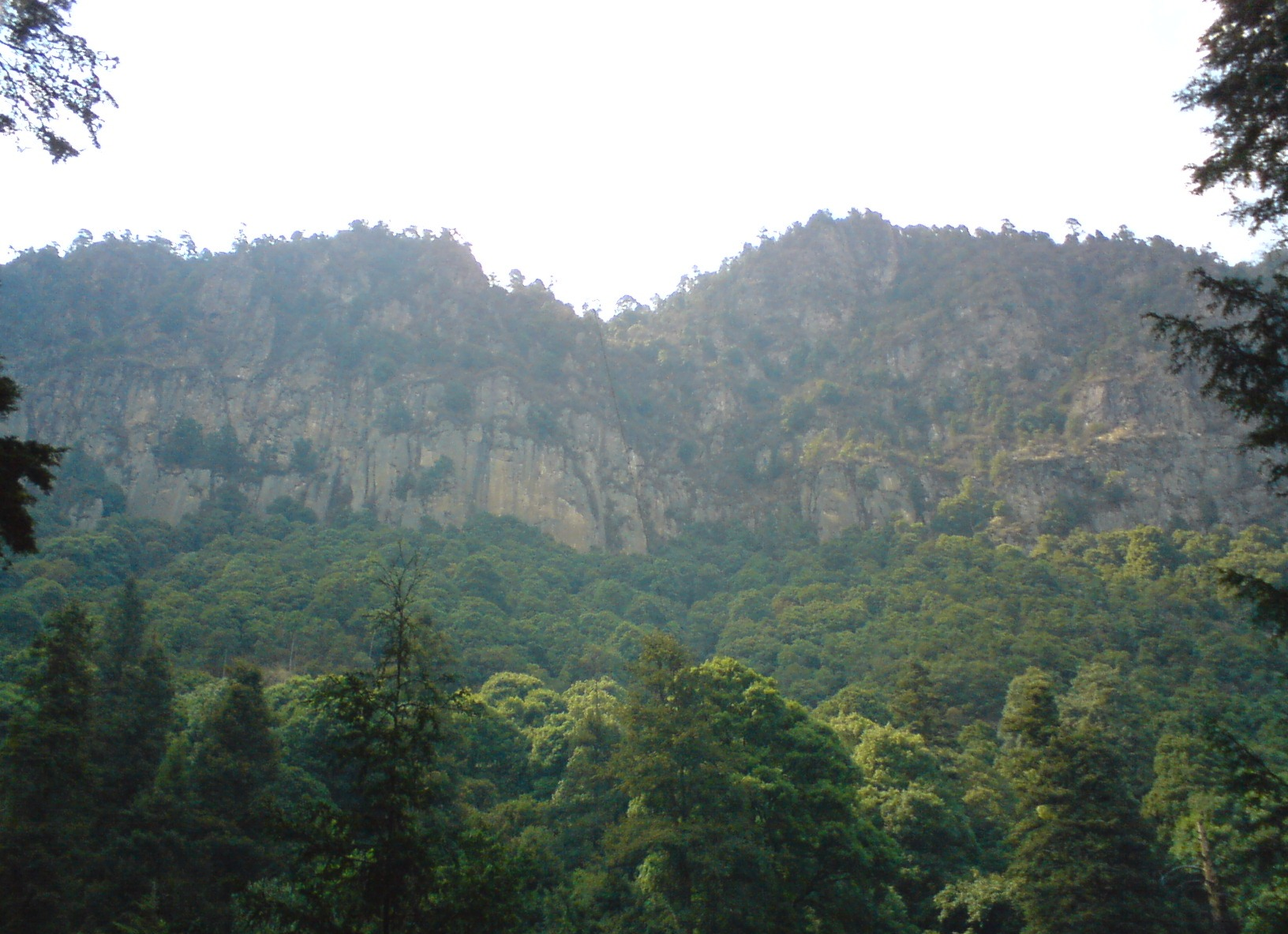
Canyon walls in Los Dinamos

Magdalena Contreras is located in the southwest area of the Federal District of Mexico City. It is bordered to the north, south, and east by the boroughs of Álvaro Obregón and Tlalpan with the State of Mexico to the west. It has a territory of 7,458.43 ha (28.8 sq mi) accounting for 5.1% of the Federal District. It has an average altitude of 2,510 m (8,235 ft) above sea level. The borough is divided into forty seven official neighborhoods called colonias. The oldest of these are La Magdalena Contrereas, San Jerónimo Aculco, San Bernabé Ocotepec, and San Nicolás Totolapan.

Magdalena Contreras lies in the southwest area of the Valley of Mexico along the lower eastern slopes of the Sierra de las Cruces which is a volcanic mountain range. The geographic features of the borough stretch from foothills to the lower mountains of the volcanic range. The hills and mountains are separated by ravines and canyons. Major elevations include Cerro Panza (3,600 m [11,811 ft]), Nezehuiloya (3,760 m [12,336 ft]), Pico Acoconetla (3,400 m [11,155 ft]), Cerro Palmitas (3,700 m [12,139 ft]), Cerro Palmas (3,789 m [12,431 ft]), Piedras Encimadas (3,200 m [10,499 ft]), El Aguajito (2,350 m [7,710 ft]), Tarumba (3,470 m [11,385 ft]), Cerro del Judío (2,770 m [9,088 ft]), Cerro Sasacapa (3,250 m [10,663 ft]), and Cerro San Miguel (3,630 m [11,909 ft]) . Principle canyons and ravines which are located in the center of the borough include Tlalpuente, Cainotitas, Atzoma, and Tejocote.

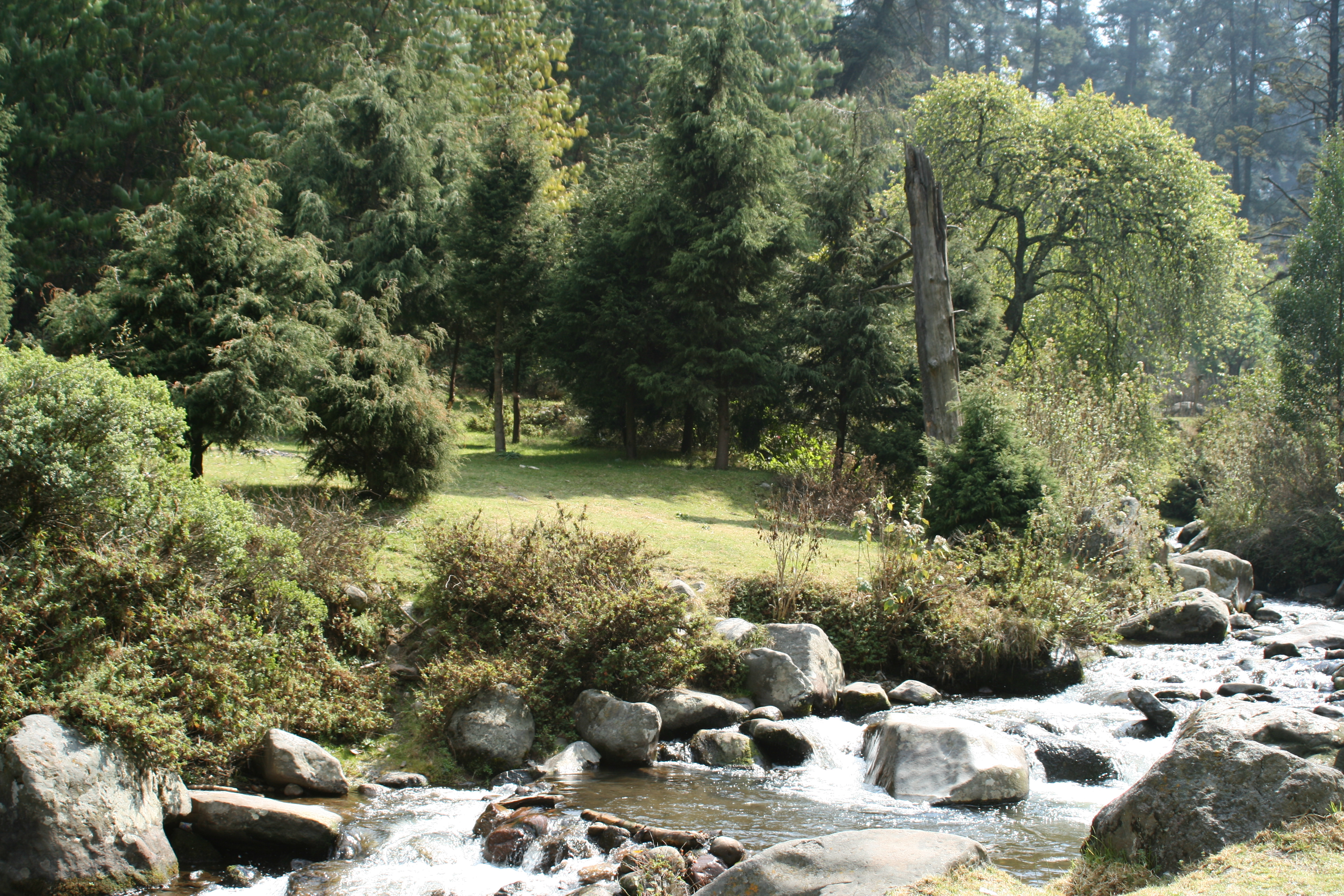
Creek in Los Dinamos

The ravines and canyons are carved by streams and run off from freshwater springs. Some of these flow year round and others only during the summer rainy season. The most important springs are Pericos, Mal Paso, Apapxtla, Las Ventanas, Cieneguillas, Los Cuervos, and San Miguel. There are two major flows of water—the Río Magdalena and the Río Eslava. The Río Magdalena is the only free flowing river in the Federal District. It begins on the slopes of the Cerro La Palma in the Cuajimalpa borough. Some of the water is captured at a section of the Los Dinamos park to be treated at a plant but the rest flows down to the floor of the valley. The borough has little in the way of structured drainage for wastewater and rainwater. Much of the wastewater flows openly which has contaminated local streams, the Río Magdalena, and the supply of drinking water. The problem is serious enough in the urbanized area to affect the population's health.

=== Climate ===
There are three main climates found in the borough. The urbanized part is temperate and semi-moist. Conservation areas between 2,900–3,500 m (9,500–11,500 ft) above sea level are semi-cold and semi-moist, and those areas above 3,700 m (12,100 ft) are semi-cold and moist. All areas receive most of their rainfall during the summer rainy season particularly in July. This precipitation can often take the form of hail, with fog common during the summer and in November and December. Snow is rare.

Presa Anzaldo

Climate chart (precipitation, max. and min. temperature)
J	F	M	A	M	J	J	A	S	O	N	D
9 21 5	6 22 5	12 24 7	22 25 9	72 25 10	180 23 11	204 22 10	198 22 10	174 22 10	70 22 9	8 22 7	6 21 5
- █ Average max. and min. temperatures in °C
- █ Precipitation totals in mm
Imperial conversion
J	F	M	A	M	J	J	A	S	O	N	D
0.4 70 41	0.2 72 41	0.5 75 45	0.9 77 48	2.8 77 50	7.1 73 52	8 72 50	7.8 72 50	6.9 72 50	2.8 72 48	0.3 72 45	0.2 70 41
- █ Average max. and min. temperatures in °F
- █ Precipitation totals in inches

Monte Alegre

Climate chart (precipitation, max. and min. temperature)
J	F	M	A	M	J	J	A	S	O	N	D
15 13 −2	12 14 −1	11 15 1	52 17 2	96 17 3	260 16 4	285 15 4	262 15 4	240 15 3	65 14 2	12 13 0	10 13 −1
- █ Average max. and min. temperatures in °C
- █ Precipitation totals in mm
Imperial conversion
J	F	M	A	M	J	J	A	S	O	N	D
0.6 55 28	0.5 57 30	0.4 59 34	2 63 36	3.8 63 37	10 61 39	11 59 39	10 59 39	9.4 59 37	2.6 57 36	0.5 55 32	0.4 55 30
- █ Average max. and min. temperatures in °F
- █ Precipitation totals in inches

=== Natural resources ===
Wildlife and native flora are mostly restricted to the conservation areas of the southern two thirds of the borough. The vegetation of this conservation area is an important source for oxygenation in the Valley of Mexico. Vegetation varies by altitude. Tree species include oaks, holm oaks, and pines. Bushes, brush, and other vegetation is mostly deciduous and includes plants from the legume and cactus families. A number of ravines and some of the higher altitudes have species adapted to wetter climes including Alnus jorullensis, Salix bonpladiana, Fraxinus uhdei, Buddlei cordata, Pronus capuli, and Taxodium mucronatum. In the pre-Hispanic period, fauna was highly varied; however, many species, such as wildcats, wolves, coyotes, anteaters and many others, are no longer found due to human settlement and habitat loss. Smaller mammals such as rabbits and squirrels still remain, especially in the higher elevations. Various types of birds such as hummingbirds, carpenter birds, and more, along with various lizards, snakes, and amphibians remain.

The borough has important ecological and tourist centers but these are facing degradation from urban sprawl. The area is 73% under conservation with 18% in urban space. An estimated 3.5% of the conservation area has illegal settlements. The illegal settlements are problematic for the borough with most environmental damage occurring in or near them. For environmental and safety reasons, a significant problem is the illegal construction of residences on the steep slopes of ravines. These illegal settlements also generate a large number of dumps of solid and liquid waste into ravines which pollute the water supply. The borough states that there are 106 areas of construction, about 1,000 residences, at high risk of landslides during the rainy season. Efforts to combat these problems include relocating those residing in illegal settlements and developing ecotourism and other programs for those that own rural areas of the borough.

=== Communities ===
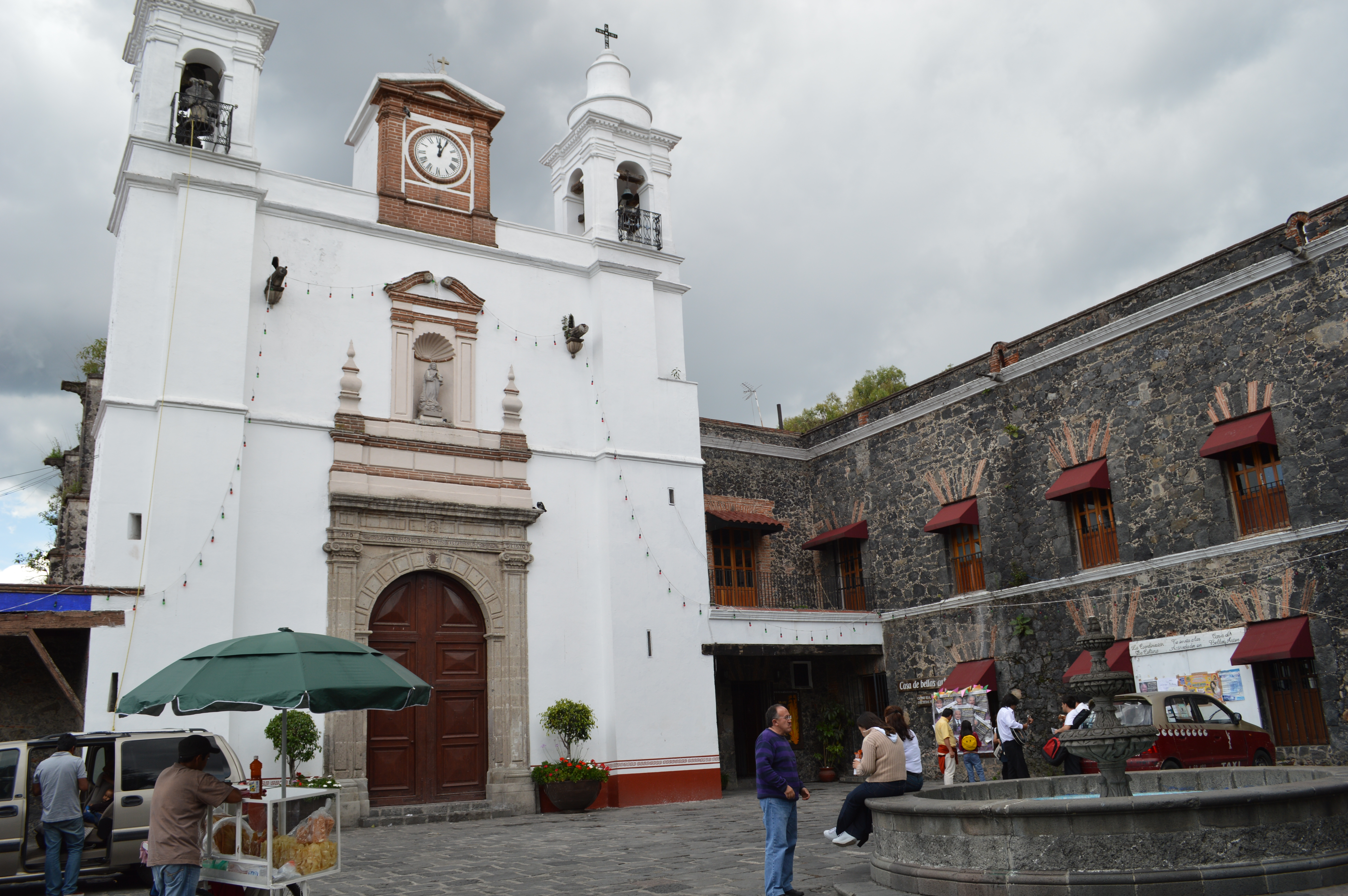
Concepción church and Casa de Bellas Artes

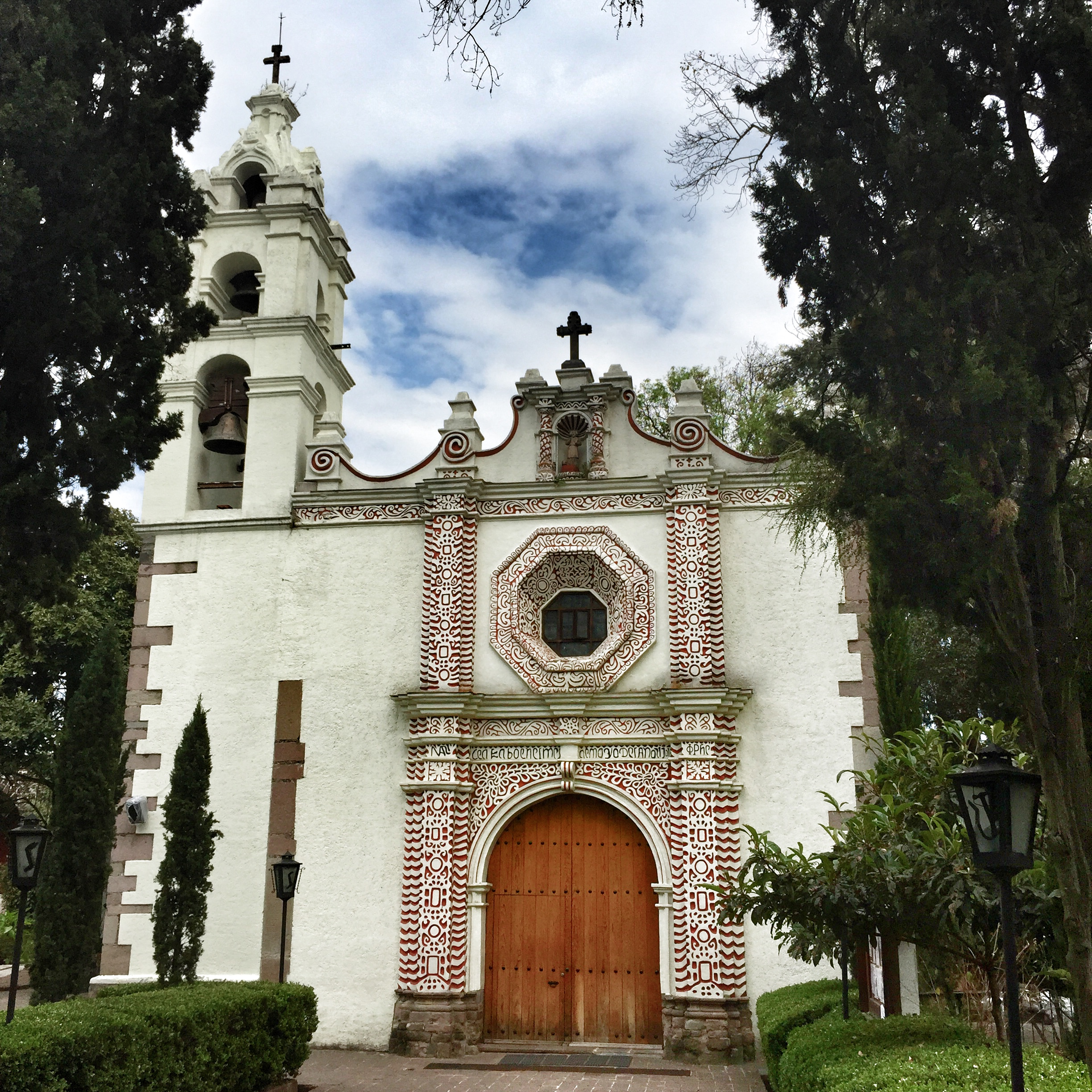
Church of San Jerónimo Aculco, San Jerónimo Lídice

The four oldest communities in the borough are La Magdalena Atlitic, San Nicolás Totolapan, San Jerónimo Aculco, and San Barnabé Ocotepec, all of pre-Hispanic origin. The modern community of La Magdalena Atlitic is centered on a church which was founded in the 16th century as a hermitage. The current structure dates to 1760. In 1932, it was named a national monument. The church has a Baroque facade with raised patterns, fronted by a stone paved atrium which has a fountain with an image of the Archangel Michael. The main portal is flanked by Doric pilasters holding up an arch and a cornice to the choir window. Inside, at the base of the arches over the main altar, there are feather designs unique to Mexico.

The town of San Nicolás Totolapan is centered on the Plaza Cívica Benito Juárez. Its church was founded in 1535 over a former pre-Hispanic ceremonial center. It has as simple facade and a Baroque bell tower surrounded by gardens that contains a stone with inscriptions. San Jerónimo Aculco has a plaza called Plaza Cívica Lidice, named after a Czech town that attacked the Nazis in 1942. It contains Rosedal de Paz (Rose Garden of Peace) and mural called Campos de Luz y Muerte (Fields of Light and Death) by Ariosto Otero. The town of San Jerónimo Aculco dates back to the Toltec period. Its church was built in the 16th century by the Franciscans and maintains its open chapel and original baptismal font. Its facade is Baroque with sculpted sandstone. Its atrium dates to the 18th century. The San Baranbé Ocotepec church was built in the 16th century as part of evangelization efforts and dedicated to Barnabas. Its main altar is Baroque and there are archeological remains in its atrium.

History and population growth have led to other communities being established in the area. In the colonial period up until the 19th century, the main industry was textiles. Textile factories were built in the area now known as Colonia Contreras. The grounds of the former El Águila textile mill are now the Foro Cultural (Cultural Forum), inaugurated in 1979. Remains of the mill's installations, such as its smokestack, still remain, but it is now a wooded area with an auditorium, gallery, offices, workshops and libraries. Near the Foro is the Purísima Concepción Church. It was founded in the 16th century, but the current structure was built in the 17th by the Contreras family, owners of the El Águila mill. It offered mass to textile workers. The area's former rail station, Estación Ferrocarril de Cuernavaca, is now a park. It contains a large mural by Ariosto Otero called El viaje del siglo veinte (Voyage of the 20th Century) that features the "501" train. This train carried famous passengers such as Diego Rivera, Tin Tan, and Lilia Prado.

Although named for the Magdalena and Contreras areas, the borough's main institutions are in Colonial Barranca Seca. These include the civic plaza, the municipal building, and the Centro Cultural La Magdalena Contreras, which is in a former 1940s movie theater . Other notable, modern communities include the Unidad Habitacional de Servicios Sociales, which was established in 1960, Ampliación Lomas de San Bernabé, El Tanque, and La Malinche.

== Economy ==
The borough is mostly residential in the northern third and mostly rural, agricultural, and conservation area in the south. The major population centers are found in the lower elevations of the central section of the borough.

For both environmental and economic reasons, ecotourism is an important aspect of the borough economy. The borough government has promoted this development over the past twenty years by encouraging major landholders to develop ecotourism parks and other measures. It established a tourism corridor mostly focused on the older communities and natural areas. Magdalena Atlitic was declared a Barrio Magico with a "tourism market" located just outside the entrance to Los Dinamos. Established in 2010 to encourage the area's reputation for ecology, the Feria de la Trucha y la Quesadilla (Trout and Quesadilla Fair) occurs each year in this borough.

The borough has several major ecotourism areas. The largest of these is Los Dinamos Park which is part of the Bosques de la Cañada de Contreras conservation area. It has an area of 2,429 ha (9 sq mi) that encompass a series of canyons formed by streams that eventually empty into Río Magdalena. The longest of these canyons is 12 m (39.4 ft). The park has over 26 km (16.2 mi) of hiking paths which connect with those of San Nicolás Totolapan.The park also contains the remains of several former textile factories which used the rivers for power.

The ejido of San Nicolás Totolapan has two main ecotourism areas, one called Parque Ecoturístico and the other called Valle de Monte Alegre with a total area of 1,700 ha (7 sq mi). The ejido is located in the south of the borough, on the northwest slope of the Ajusco Volcano. The San Bernabé Ocotepec Ecotourism Park is located on the Cajetes and Meyuca mountains next to the community of the same name. It is 337.1 ha (1.3 sq mi) of pine and oyamel fir forest and was established in 1998 to block the advance of urban sprawl. The Mazatepetl Eco-archeological Park is located on the San Bernabé Ocotepec ejido on a large hill called Cerro del Judío. It contains a restored pyramid originally constructed by the Otomi between 1200 CE and 1380 CE. Mazatepetl is one of oldest stone constructions in the Valley of Mexico.

== Culture ==
Some of Magdalena Contrera's rural character is still preserved in the observances of religious festivals. The Day of the Cross (May 3) is a popular festival in the borough, especially in the La Cruz neighborhood and the Cerro de Judío. During Holy Week, the custom of erecting altars in honor of the Virgin of Sorrows is still observed. There is a traditional passion play depicting the passion and crucifixion of Christ during the week, with the main event on Good Friday at the Cerro de Judío. In addition, it is traditional to spend Holy Saturday at Los Dinamos. Holy Week events have drawn up to 80,000 people at Los Dinamos. In addition, the area has a major annual pilgrimage to Chalma during this week.

Another major traditional observance is Day of the Dead. This holiday has drawn up to 90,000 people to the borough, mostly to the cemeteries of San Bernabé, San Jerónimo and San Francisco.

== Education ==
Public high schools of the Instituto de Educación Media Superior del Distrito Federal (IEMS) include:

- Escuela Preparatoria Magdalena Contreras "Ignacio Manuel Altamirano"

Private schools:

- Colegio Williams Campus San Jerónimo
- Green Hills School South Campus
- Vermont School Plantel San Jerónimo
