= La Primavera Biosphere Reserve =

Biosphere reserve in Jalisco, Mexico

- La Primavera Flora and Fauna Protection Area
- IUCN category VI (protected area with sustainable use of natural resources)
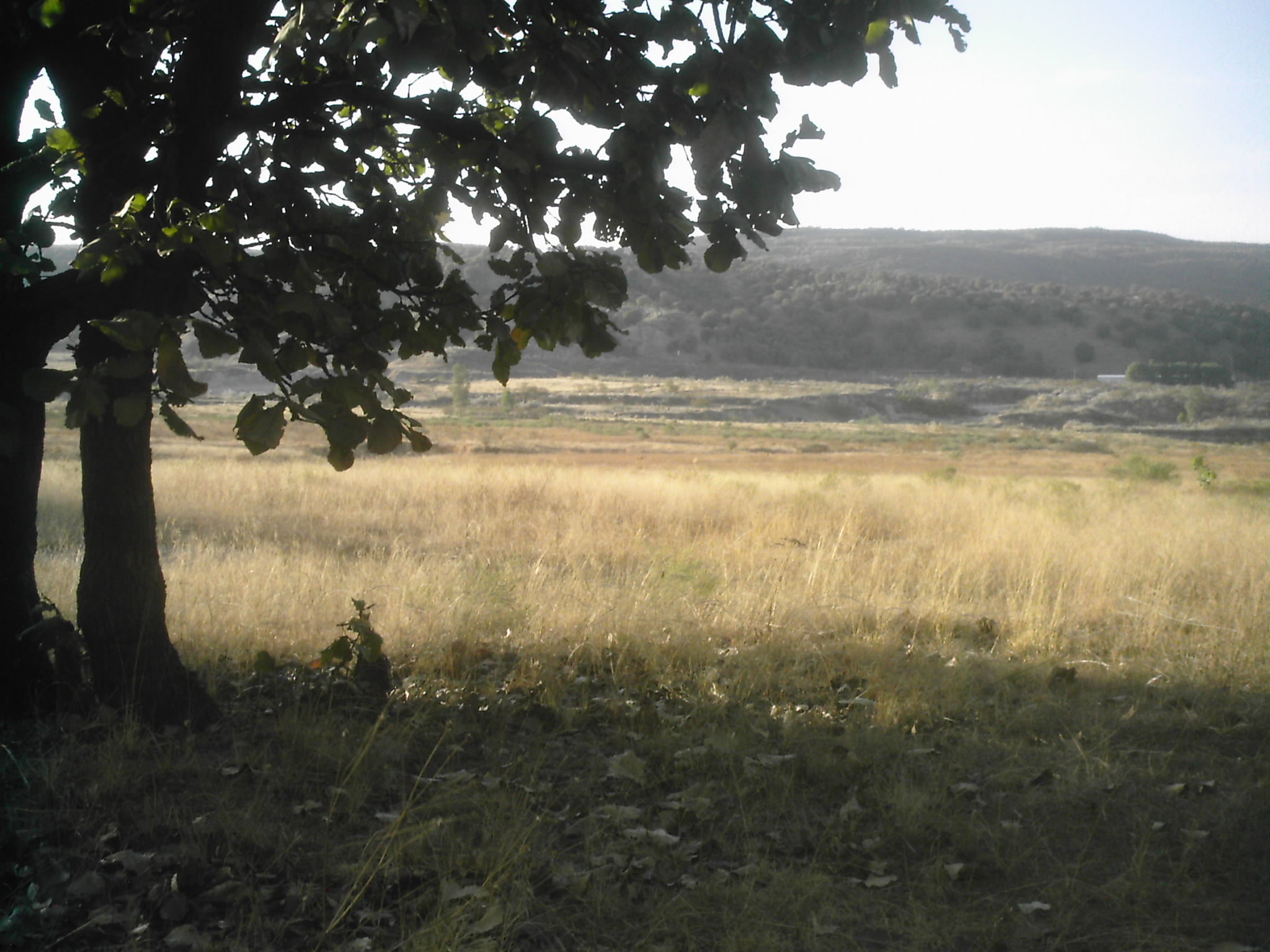

- Location within Mexico
- Location: Jalisco, Mexico
- Nearest city: Guadalajara
- Coordinates: 20°41′N 103°31′W
- Area: 30,500 ha (118 sq mi)
- Designation: biosphere reserve and flora and fauna protection area
- Designated: 2000 (flora and fauna protection area) 2006 (biosphere reserve)
- Administrator: National Commission of Natural Protected Areas

La Primavera Biosphere Reserve, also known as La Primavera Flora and Fauna Protection Area, is a protected natural area in western Mexico. It is located in the state of Jalisco, immediately west of the city of Guadalajara.

== Geography ==
It covers 30,500 hectares (305 km^{2} or approximately 118 square miles) and is located west of Guadalajara, Mexico. It is a protected area and a UNESCO Biosphere Reserve. The terrain is rugged, ranging from 1400 to 2200 meters elevation. the reserve includes the Sierra la Primavera, an inactive volcanic region. The Sierra is relatively geologically recent, forming in a series of eruptions between 120,000 and 20,000 years ago. There are numerous springs and 20 permanent streams. Some drain north or east into the Río Grande de Santiago, which lies to the north, and flow westwards to form the headwaters of the Ameca River.

The climate is tropical, warm, and subhumid, with an annual mean temperature of 21º C. Mean annual rainfall is 980 mm.

== Flora and fauna ==
The natural vegetation is pine–oak forest. More than 742 plant species have been recorded in the reserve, including 80% of the orchid species reported in Jalisco.

Stream valleys in the western portion of the reserve, which form the headwaters of the Ameca River, are home are patches of relict cloud forest. Typical trees include Clethra rosei, Ficus insipida, Ilex dugesii, Morella cerifera, Persea hintonii, Prunus serotina subsp. capuli, Quercus magnoliifolia, Quercus confertifolia (syn. Quercus gentryi), and Salix taxifolia. An endemic species of poplar, Populus primaveralepensis, was recently discovered growing in these stream valleys.

Around 200 resident and migratory bird species have been recorded in the reserve. Native birds include the lesser roadrunner (Geococcyx velox), berylline hummingbird (Saucerottia beryllina), russet-crowned motmot (Momotus mexicanus), black-throated magpie-jay (Calocitta colliei), spotted wren (Campylorhynchus gularis), brown-backed solitaire (Myadestes occidentalis), blue mockingbird (Melanotis caerulescens), collared towhee (Pipilo ocai), blue bunting (Cyanocompsa parellina), black-vented oriole (Icterus wagleri), and rusty-crowned ground sparrow (Melozone kieneri).

73 native mammal species have been recorded in the reserve, as have 49 species of reptiles and amphibians.

== Conservation ==
La Primavera was designated a forest protection area and wildlife refuge in 1980 by presidential decree. It was redesignated a flora and fauna protection area by the Mexican government in 2000. In 2006 it was designated a biosphere reserve by UNESCO.

Guadalajara is Mexico's third-largest metropolitan area, and it extends to the reserve. The reserve is one of residents' favorite recreational areas. There are 12 trails in the reserve, and 8 educational camps. 1560 ha of the reserve is dedicated to public use and recreational activities.

The reserve's forests help moderate Guadalajara's climate, improve air quality, and absorb carbon dioxide and other airborne pollutants. The forests also improve water quality in the region's rivers, recharge groundwater basins, and reduce flooding risk in communities downstream.
