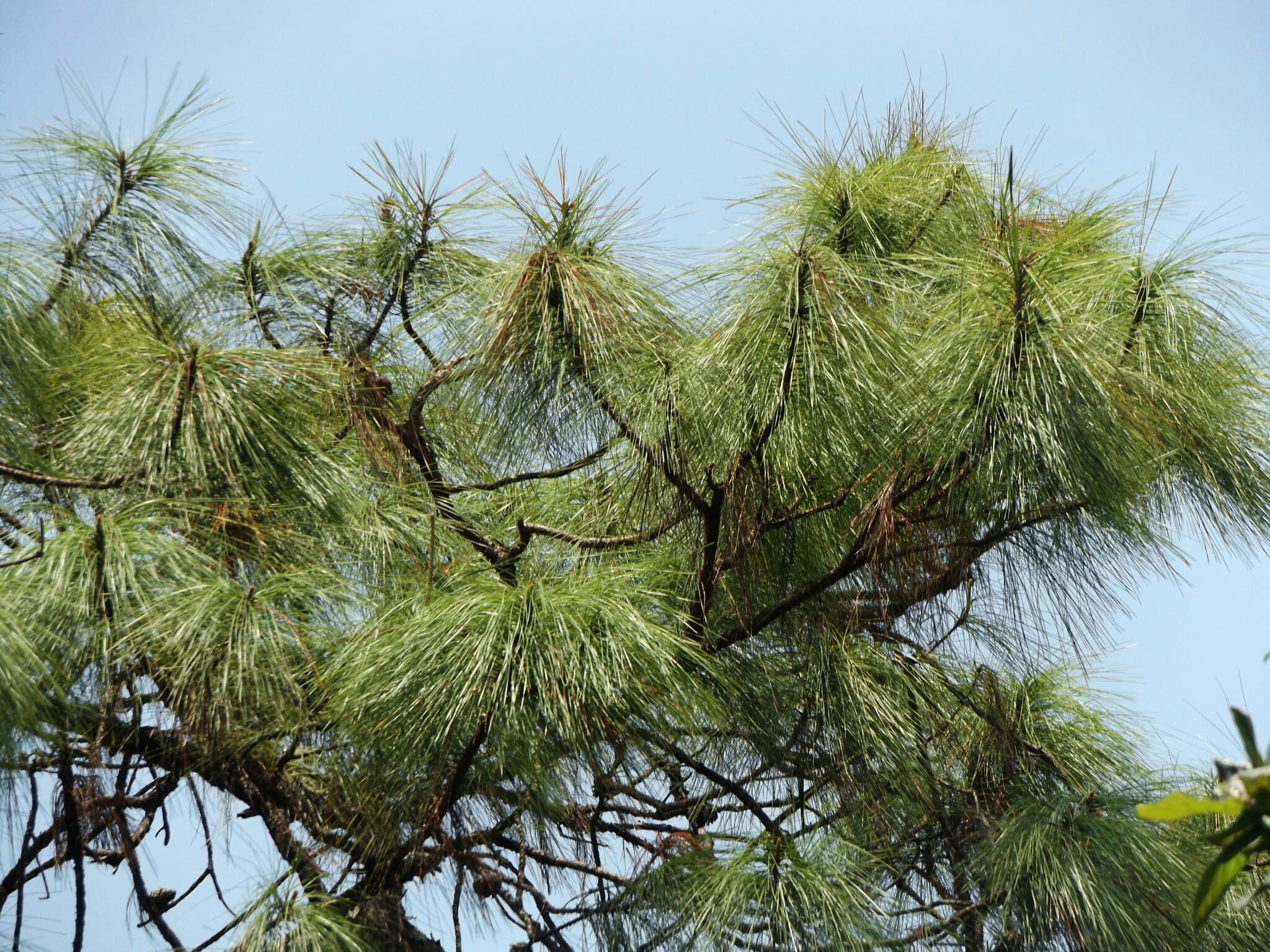
- The upper crown of an individual

Scientific classification
- Kingdom: Plantae
- Clade: Tracheophytes
- Clade: Gymnosperms
- Division: Pinophyta
- Class: Pinopsida
- Order: Pinales
- Family: Pinaceae
- Genus: Pinus
- Subgenus: P. subg. Pinus
- Section: P. sect. Trifoliae
- Subsection: P. subsect. Australes
- Species: P. vallartensis

Binomial name
- Pinus vallartensis Pérez de la Rosa & Gernandt

= Pinus vallartensis =

Species of conifer

Pinus vallartensis, rarely called the Vallarta pine, is a species of medium-sized conifer in the family Pinaceae. The species of pine was described by Pérez de la Rosa and David S. Gernandt in 2017. It is in the Pinus subsect. Australes.

== Description ==
Pinus vallartensis on average reaches 8–12 m (26–39 ft) tall, and 30–50 cm (12–20 in) dbh. It has a wide, open crown extending for 25% or more of the species average height. Bark is 2–4 cm (0.79–1.57 in) thick, and is a red-brown to a grey color in rectangular plates. Needles (leaves) are in fascicles of 3–5, 17–20 cm (6.7–7.9 in) long, and have a light green tint. Cones are 2.5–3.5 cm (0.98–1.38 in) long, and are a yellow-brown color. Cones fall with part of the branchlet still attached. Seeds are 5.3–7.3 mm (0.21–0.29 in) long, and have a dark brown to yellow-brown coloration. Yearly pollination occurs throughout parts of April and September, with seeds being dispersed throughout March and April. Germination of the seeds occurs in May or June, soon after the seasonal rainfall begins.

== Distribution and habitat ==
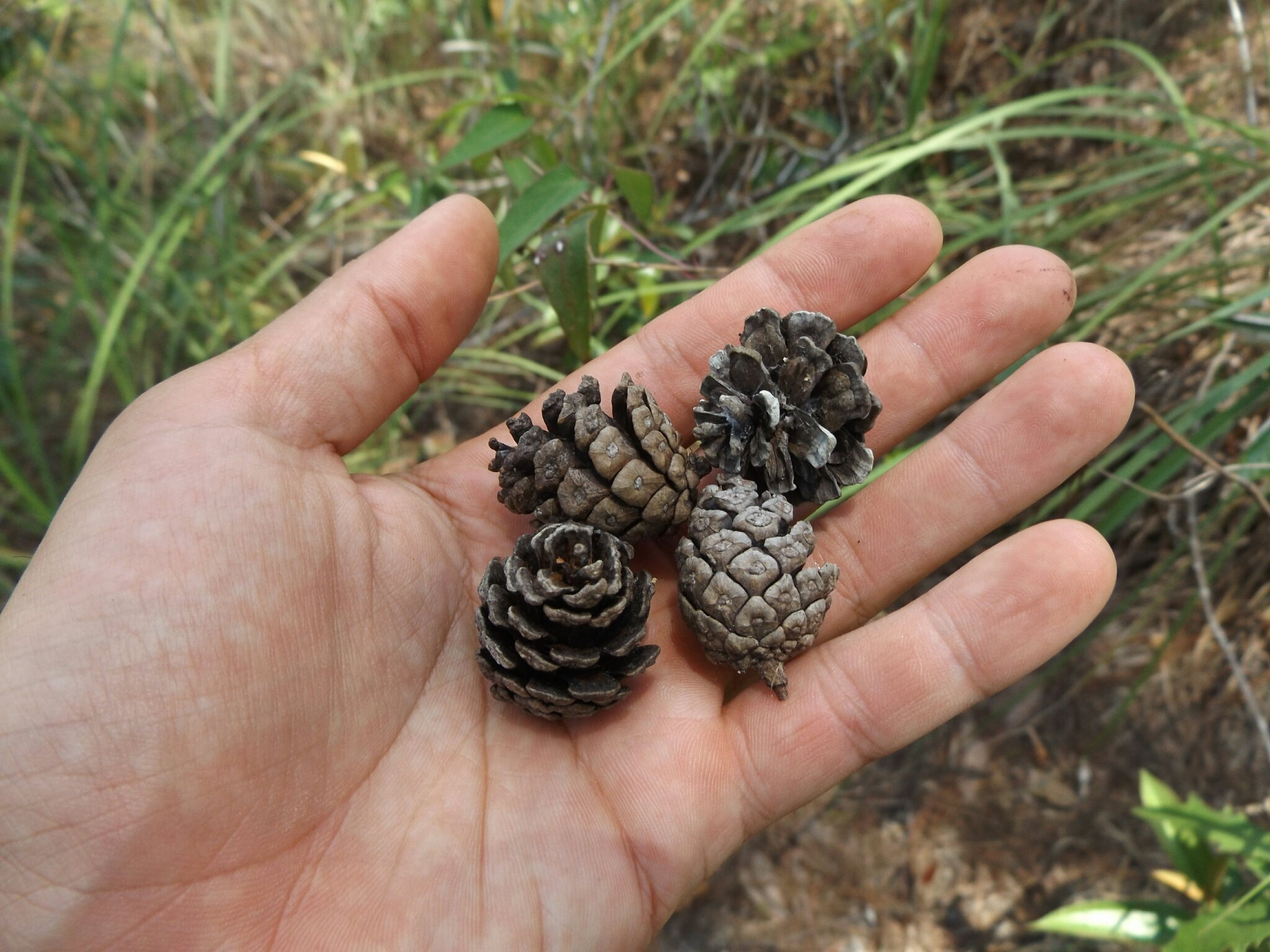
Opened mature cone details

Pinus vallartensis is endemic to Jalisco, Mexico, primarily growing near the Municipalities of Puerto Vallarta, Cabo Corrientes, and Talpa de Allende, where its estimated population is below 2,500 individuals. It grows at elevations of 380–1,347 m (1,247–4,419 ft), and thrives in deep, acidic soils. The region where its range resides receives 120 cm (47 in) of rain every year, and is located in the subtropical zone. It is seen growing beside three other species of pine (Pinus spp.), Pinus jaliscana, Pinus maximinoi and Pinus oocarpa. It is also seen growing beside three species of oak (Quercus spp.), being Quercus aristata, Quercus elliptica, and Quercus magnoliifolia.

== Classification and conservation ==
Pinus vallartensis is most closesly related to Pinus jaliscana and Pinus oocarpa, having similar traits and genetics between the two sympatric species.

It is listed as "Endangered" by most sources for its endemicity and rarity throughout its small-sized natural range. The IUCN Red List has not officially assigned a conservation status to the species, although the listed status above is almost entirely relevant if Pinus vallartensis were to be professionally evaluated.

== Uses ==
No common uses have been recorded for Pinus vallartensis yet, for the species endemicity and rarity is quite extensive.
