= Parque Tezozómoc =

Park in Mexico City

Coordinates: 19°29′57″N 99°12′34″W

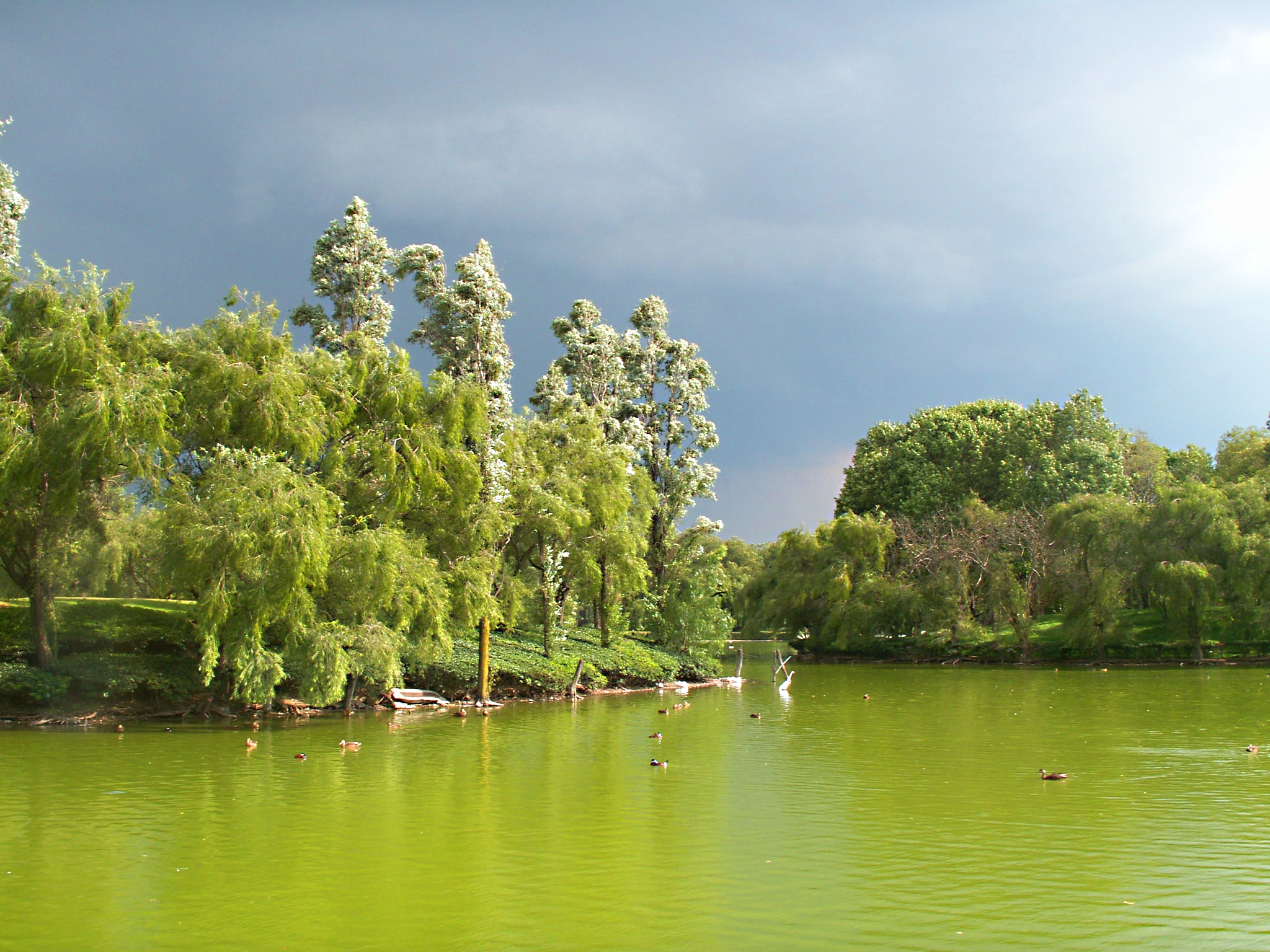
Pond and island in Parque Tezozómoc.

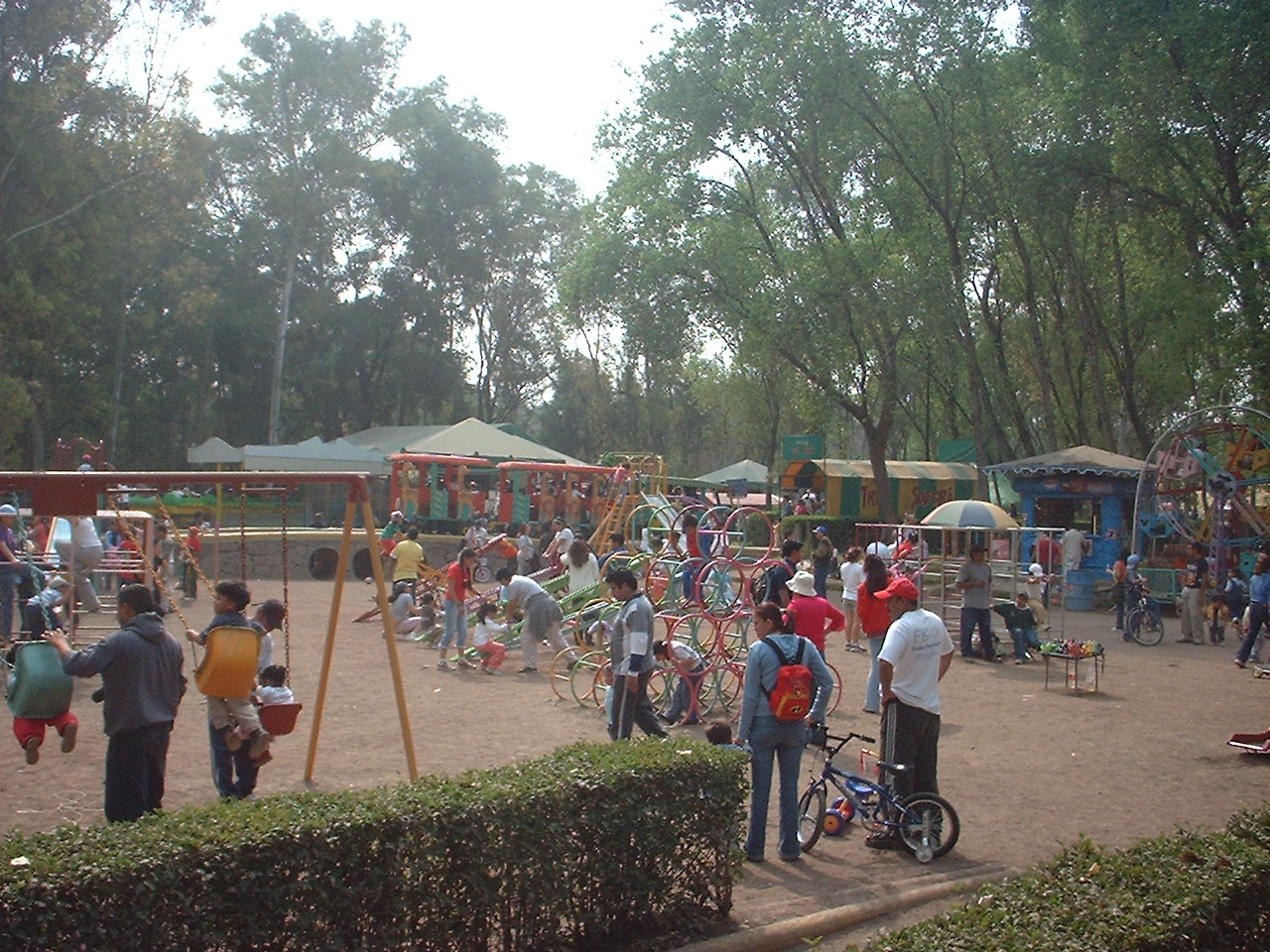
Playground.

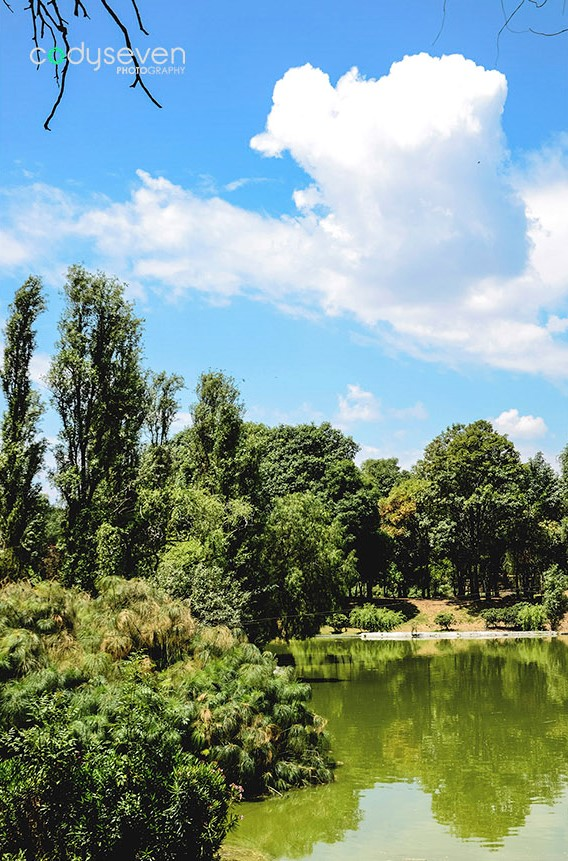

Parque Tezozómoc is a large park in Mexico City. It is located in the Azcapotzalco borough, in the northwestern section of Mexico City (México, D. F.), Mexico. It is 28 hectares (69 acres) in size.

The park was designed by Mario Schjetnan, and opened in 1982. It is near the El Rosario residential neighborhood, and was built on the land of the former Hacienda del Rosario. It is an important public open space, sports and recreational area, and a point-of-reference landmark for northwestern Mexico City.

== Features ==
In the park's center there is a large pond with a 'nature reserve' island. The Museum of Regional Art, and the Museum of Three Dimensional Art, are both located on the northern perimeter.

A scaled representation of the Valley of Mexico as it was in the Prehispanic (pre-16th century) has been created by Schjetnan, using berms and hills. Signs around the pond describe the features around the historic Lake Texcoco, that dominated the valley basin then. The Aztec city of Tenochtitlan was on an island in the former Lake Texcoco.

Today, the park is a recreational center in this area of the city. It provides a place for socializing, amusement, and recreation, with: walkway promenades, 1,200 metres (3,900 ft) cycle way, playgrounds, lawns and park benches, refreshment stands, and a skating rink. It has many sports facilities, such as: an outdoor gym, basketball courts, volleyball courts, and tennis courts.

=== Ecology ===
Parque Tezozómoc also provides a place of high ecological value. The pond has many migratory bird species, and resident bird colonies on the island. They include the white heron and many species of ducks and some varieties of invertebrates. The pond has many aquatic species too, including those introduced by local people, such as the Asian carp (Carp of Israel) and the Japanese turtle.

The parklands and its trees support various species of squirrels. There is a forest of Ahuejote (Salix bonplandiana), a tall willow tree native to the region.

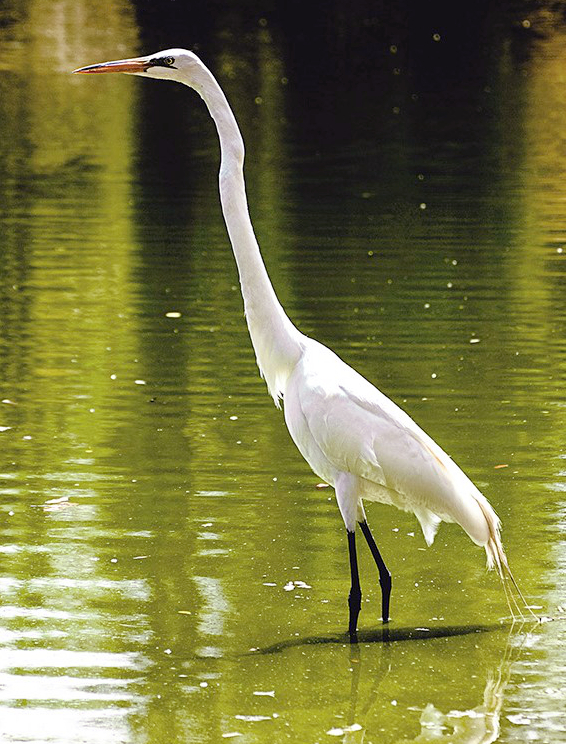
