= Sierra la Primavera =

Volcano in Jalisco, Mexico

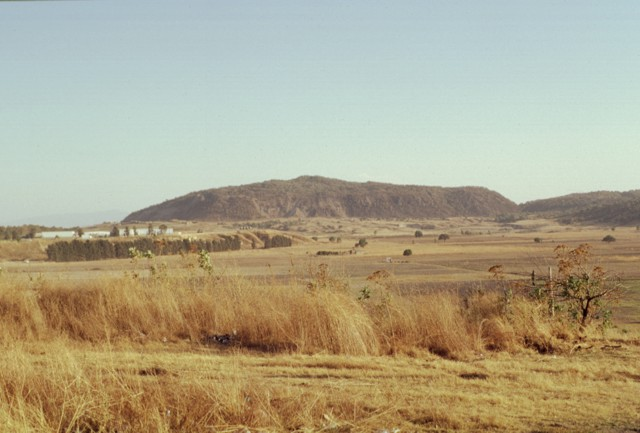
- Cerro el Colli lava dome

Highest point
- Elevation: 2,270 m (7,450 ft)
- Coordinates: 20.62°N 103.52°W

Geography
- Location within Mexico
- Location: Jalisco, Mexico

Geology
- Rock age: Pleistocene
- Volcanic belt: Trans-Mexican Volcanic Belt

Sierra la Primavera is a Late Pleistocene volcanic centre in Jalisco of central-western Mexico, located immediately west of Guadalajara in La Primavera Biosphere Reserve. It consists of a caldera, lava domes and lava flows that have formed in the last 200,000 years, with the latest known volcanic eruption having occurred about 30,000 years ago.

== Geology ==
The formation of Sierra la Primavera commenced about 120,000 years ago with the eruption of rhyolitic flows and domes. This was followed by a VEI-6 eruption about 95,000 years ago that deposited 20 km^{3} (4.8 mi^{3}) of tephra with the creation of an 11 km (6.8 mi) wide caldera. The tephra forms a volcanic deposit known as the Tala Tuff and consists of voluminous pumice flows.

Subsequent filling of the caldera with water resulted in the formation of a lake through which several lava domes were created. Several lava domes were emplaced along the caldera about 95,000 years ago, which was followed by the eruption of a younger series of ring domes about 75,000 years ago.

After uplift and sedimentation filled the lake, a final series of lava domes were erupted along the southern margin of the caldera about 60,000 to 30,000 years ago. Although volcanic eruptions are not known to have occurred from Sierra la Primavera in recorded history, it is still potentially active, containing a series of fumaroles and hot springs.

== Subfeatures ==
Sierra la Primavera contains 29 named subfeatures:

Name	Type	Coordinates
Cerro Alto	Dome	20°42′0″N 103°32′0″W
Arroyo Colorado	Dome	20°35′0″N 103°30′0″W
Arroyo Ixtahuatonte	Dome	20°38′0″N 103°30′0″W
Arroyo la Cuartilla	Dome	20°43′0″N 103°31′0″W
Arroyo las Animas	Dome	20°37′0″N 103°35′0″W
Arroyo los Pilas	Dome	20°39′0″N 103°29′0″W
Arroyo Saucillo	Vent	20°32′0″N 103°33′0″W
Cañón de las Flores	Vent	20°42′0″N 103°35′0″W
Cerro el Chapulín	Dome	20°41′0″N 103°29′0″W
Cerro Chato	Dome	20°42′0″N 103°34′0″W
Cerro el Colli	Dome	20°39′0″N 103°28′0″W
Cerro la Cuesta	Dome	20°37′0″N 103°30′0″W
Cerro el Culebreado	Dome	20°37′0″N 103°33′0″W
Dos Coyotes	Dome	20°40′0″N 103°29′0″W
Llano Grande	Vent	20°35′0″N 103°36′0″W
El Madrón	Dome	20°37′0″N 103°31′0″W
Mesa el Burro	Dome	20°43′0″N 103°35′0″W
Mesa el Chiquihuitillo	Dome	20°43′0″N 103°36′0″W
Mesa el León	Dome	20°41′0″N 103°36′0″W
Mesa el Najahuete	Dome	20°40′0″N 103°31′0″W
Mesa la Lobera	Dome	20°43′0″N 103°30′0″W
Cerro el Pedernal	Dome	20°40′0″N 103°35′0″W
Pinar de la Venta	Dome	20°43′0″N 103°25′0″W
Cerro las Planillas	Vent	20°35′0″N 103°33′0″W
La Puerta	Dome	20°37′0″N 103°35′0″W
Río Salado	Dome	20°41′0″N 103°35′0″W
Cerro San Miguel	Vent	20°36′0″N 103°36′0″W
Cerro el Tajo	Vent	20°36′0″N 103°29′0″W
Cerro el Tule	Dome	20°38′0″N 103°32′0″W

== See also ==
- List of volcanoes in Mexico
