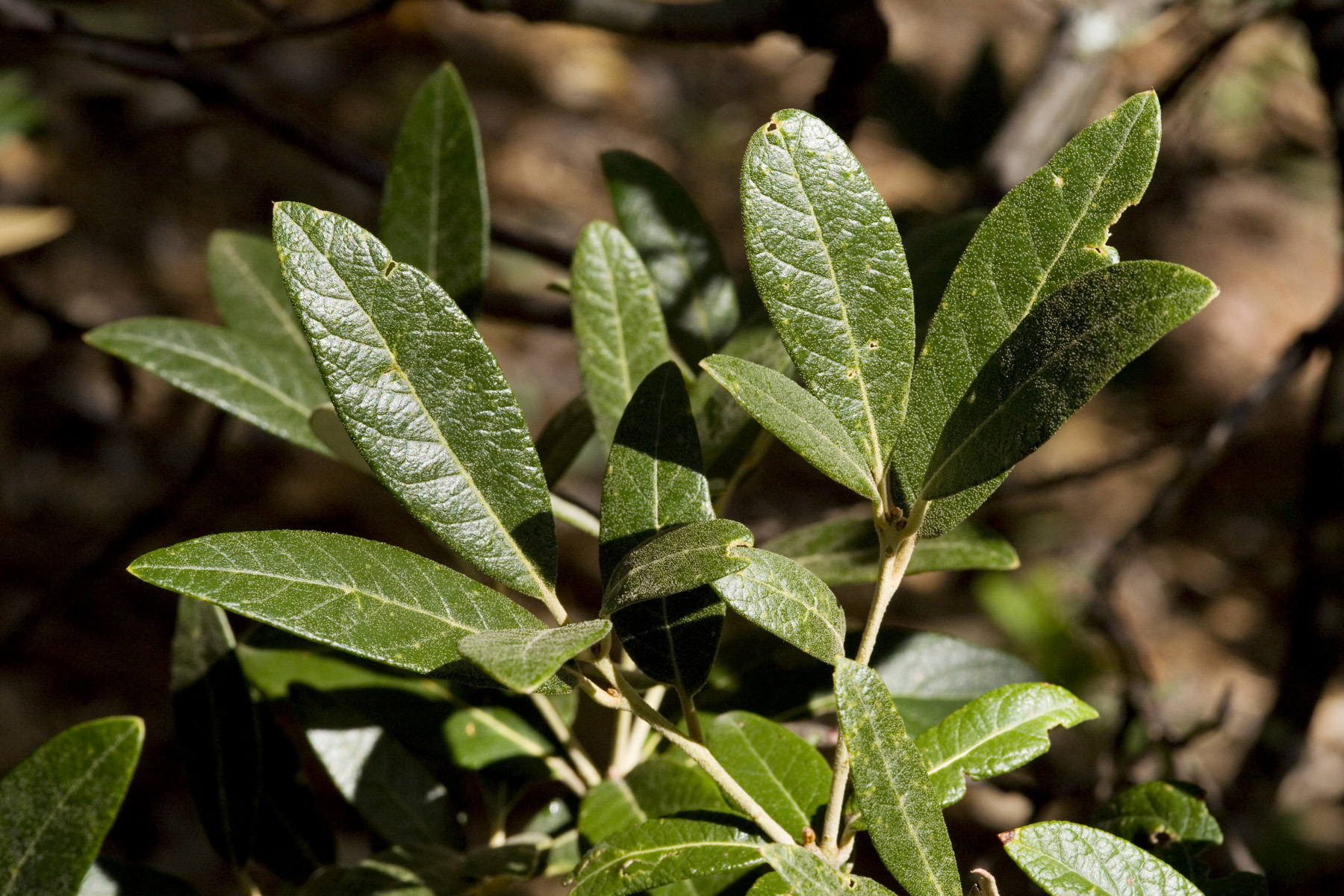

Conservation status
- Least Concern (IUCN 3.1)

Scientific classification
- Kingdom: Plantae
- Clade: Tracheophytes
- Clade: Angiosperms
- Clade: Eudicots
- Clade: Rosids
- Order: Fagales
- Family: Fagaceae
- Genus: Quercus
- Subgenus: Quercus subg. Quercus
- Section: Quercus sect. Lobatae
- Species: Q. hypoleucoides

Binomial name
- Quercus hypoleucoides A.Camus
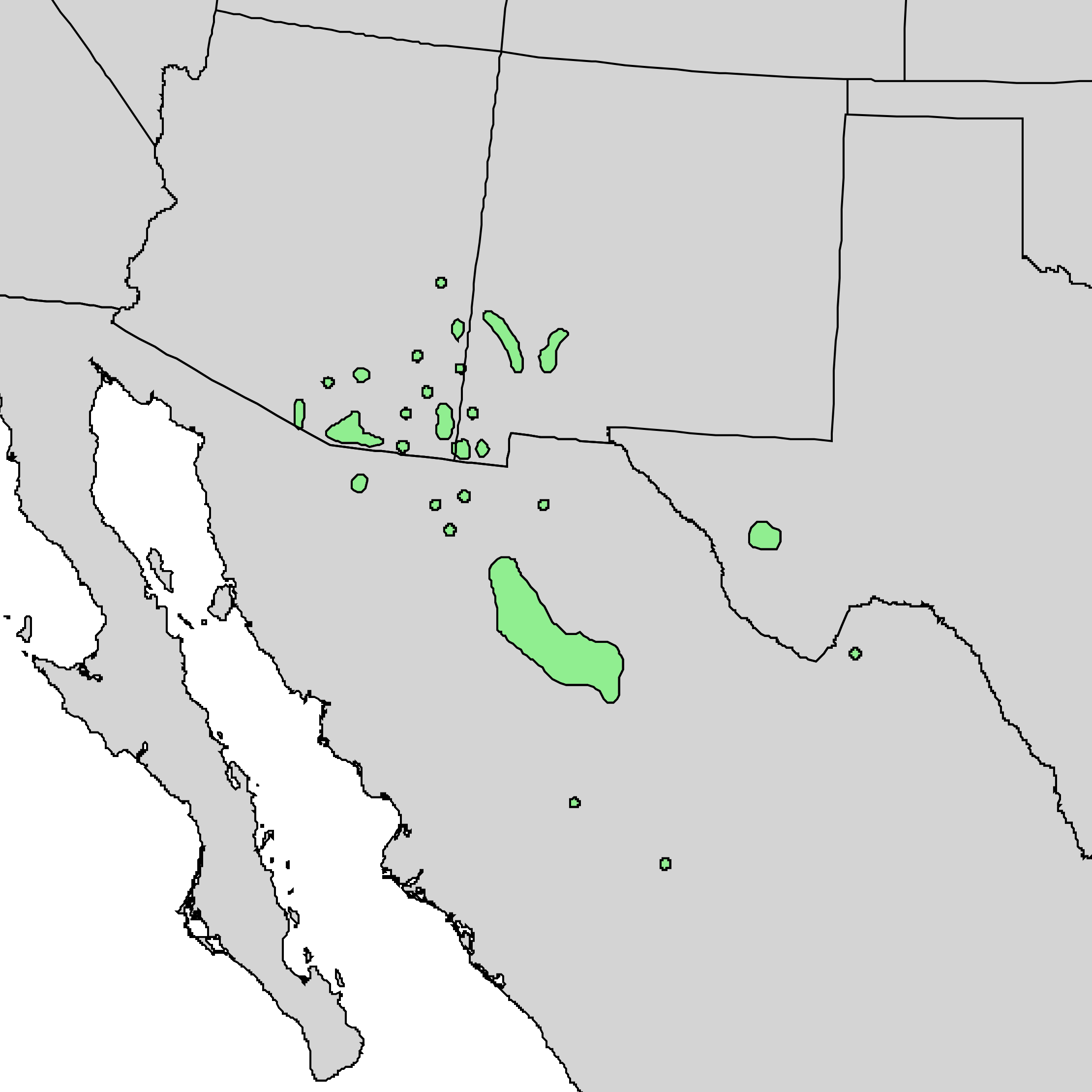
- Natural range of Quercus hypoleucoides

Synonyms
- Quercus confertifolia Torr., sensu auct.; Quercus hypoleuca Engelm., nom. illeg.

= Quercus hypoleucoides =

Species of oak tree

Quercus hypoleucoides, the silverleaf oak or the whiteleaf oak, is a North American species of oak tree or shrub. It grows in the southwestern United States and northern Mexico.

== Description ==
Quercus hypoleucoides, though usually seen as a shrub, can be found to be a full-sized tree, 9 metres (30 feet) tall in areas where it receives sufficient water.

The tree produces its flowers in the spring as most plants do. It grows in warm regions and is used as an ornamental due to its unusual foliage.

- Bark: Is dark gray in color. It is thin with shallow, lighter-colored fissures and narrow ridges.
- Twig: Reddish brown in color and are broadly triangular with a sharp point. Are slender to moderate, generally with white fuzz. The end buds are clustered.
- Leaves: Are alternate, evergreen, simple, and narrowly oblong to lanceolate. They are usually 5–10 centimetres (2 to 4 inches) long, with edges revolute. Occasionally there are a few shallow teeth, a narrow pointed tip, and a leathery texture. They are usually a shiny yellow-green on top and white or silvery on the bottom.
- Fruits: Oblong acorn that is 1.5–2 cm (1/2–3/4 in) inch long. The cap is scaly bowl-shaped and covers one-third of the nut which ripens in 1 (or 2 seasons), maturing in early fall.
- Flowers: Q. hypoleucoides is a monoecious plant, with both male and female flowers growing on the same plant. This is opposed to dioecious plants where male flowers and female flowers grow on separate trees. The male flowers form long drooping catkins that are yellow-green in color. The female flowers have very small spikes in leaf axils that appear with the leaves.
- Form: Though usually found as a shrub, given enough moisture it can become a medium-sized tree that reaches up to 18 m (60 ft) tall with a spreading round crown.

Q. hypoleucoides can be distinguished from other oaks by its lanceolate leaves which are dark green on top but silver white on the lower surface.

== Taxonomy ==
Its species name, hypoleucoides, means "white underneath", referring to the leaves. It has been referred to as Quercus hypoleuca Engelm., an illegitimate name, and as Quercus confertifolia Torr., not to be confused with Quercus confertifolia Bonpl.

== Distribution and habitat ==
The species is commonly found in moist canyons and on ridges. It also is found in coniferous forests and high elevated lands from 1,500–2,400 m (5,000 to 8,000 ft) above sea level. Mountains of southern Arizona and New Mexico such as the Santa Catalina Mountains and the Chiricahua Mountains, for example, have a pine-oak woodland at an elevation of roughly 1,710–2,160 m (5,700 to 7,200 ft). Here, Q. hypoleucoides can be found as well as other species of oak trees such as the Q. arizonica, Q. emoryi, and Q. rugosa.

Specimens have also been collected south of the international frontier, in Sonora, Chihuahua, Coahuila, and Sinaloa.

== Ecology ==
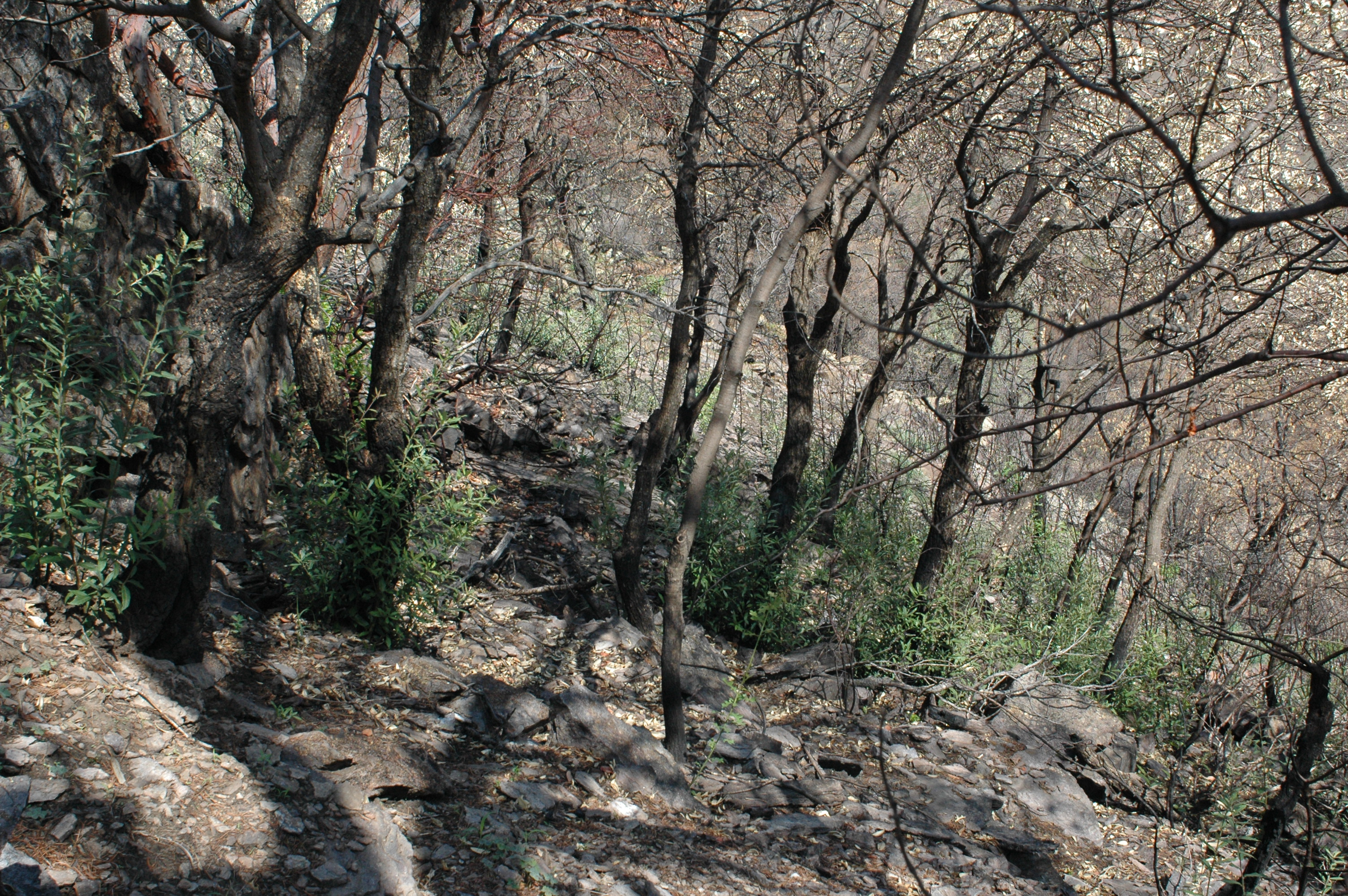
Quercus hypoleucoides resprouting following fire

This species has acorns which are eaten by both squirrels and birds. The taller trees also help to provide shade for animals below who need to get away from the strong rays of the sun.

Larvae of the moth Cameraria cretaceella mine leaves of Quercus hypoleucoides.

It is a vigorous post-fire resprouter and will form a multi-stem shrub in areas of repeated fire.

== Uses ==
The acorns can be eaten after leaching out the toxic tannic acid.

The tree has been used for ornamental purposes. Its leaves have a unique contrast due to the very white, silver color of the bottom.

== Gallery ==
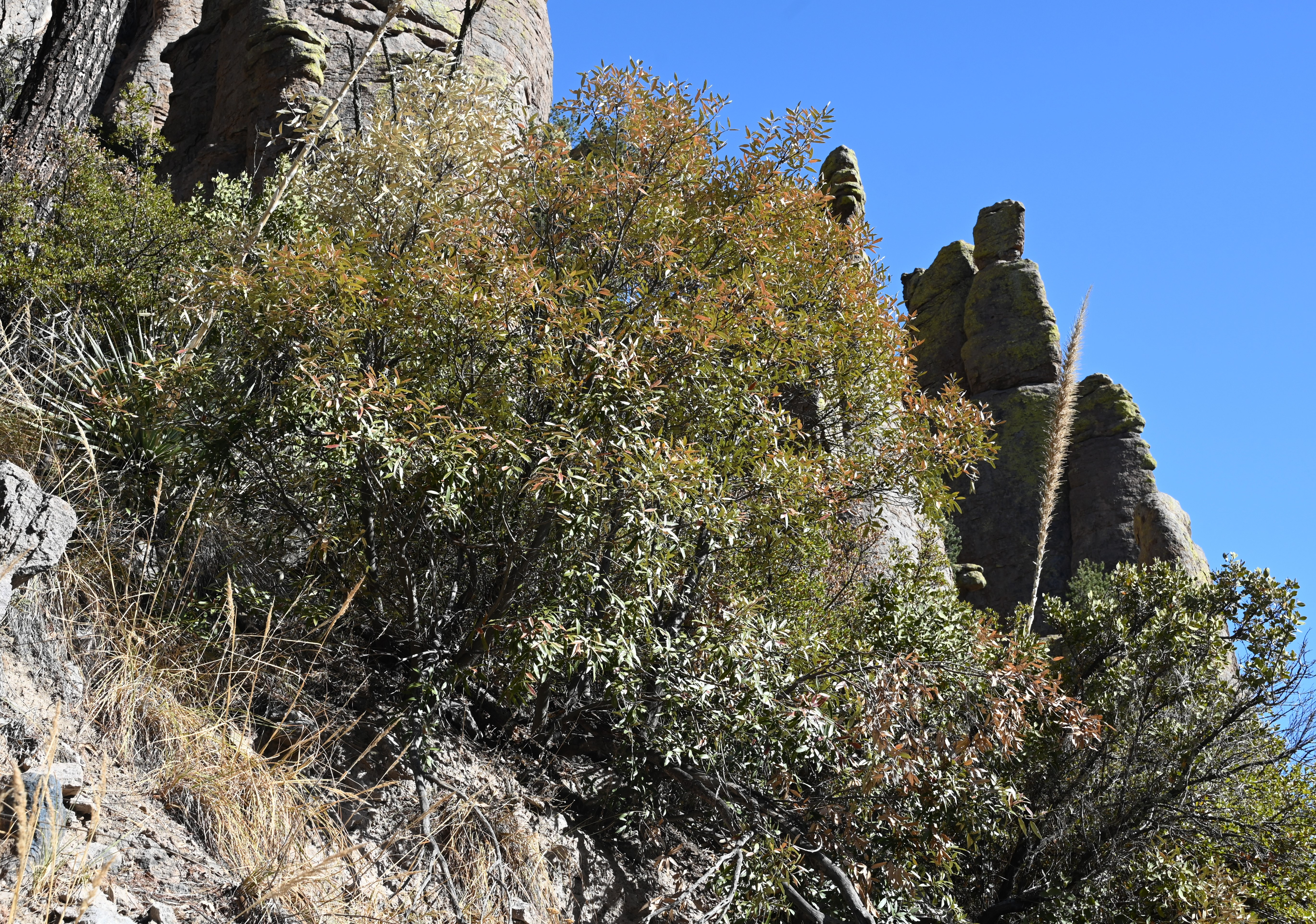
A plant in Arizona

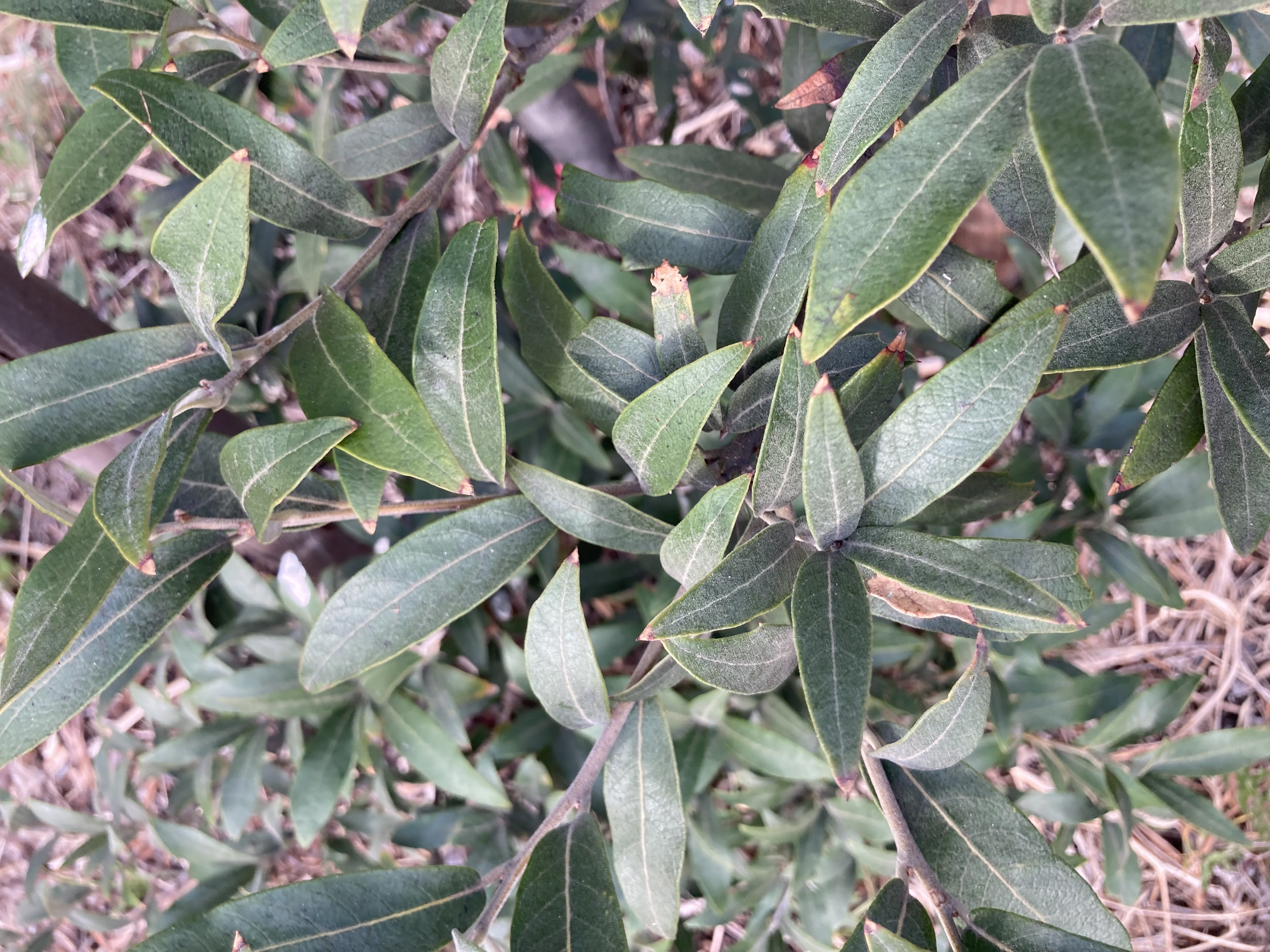
Glossy tops of leaves

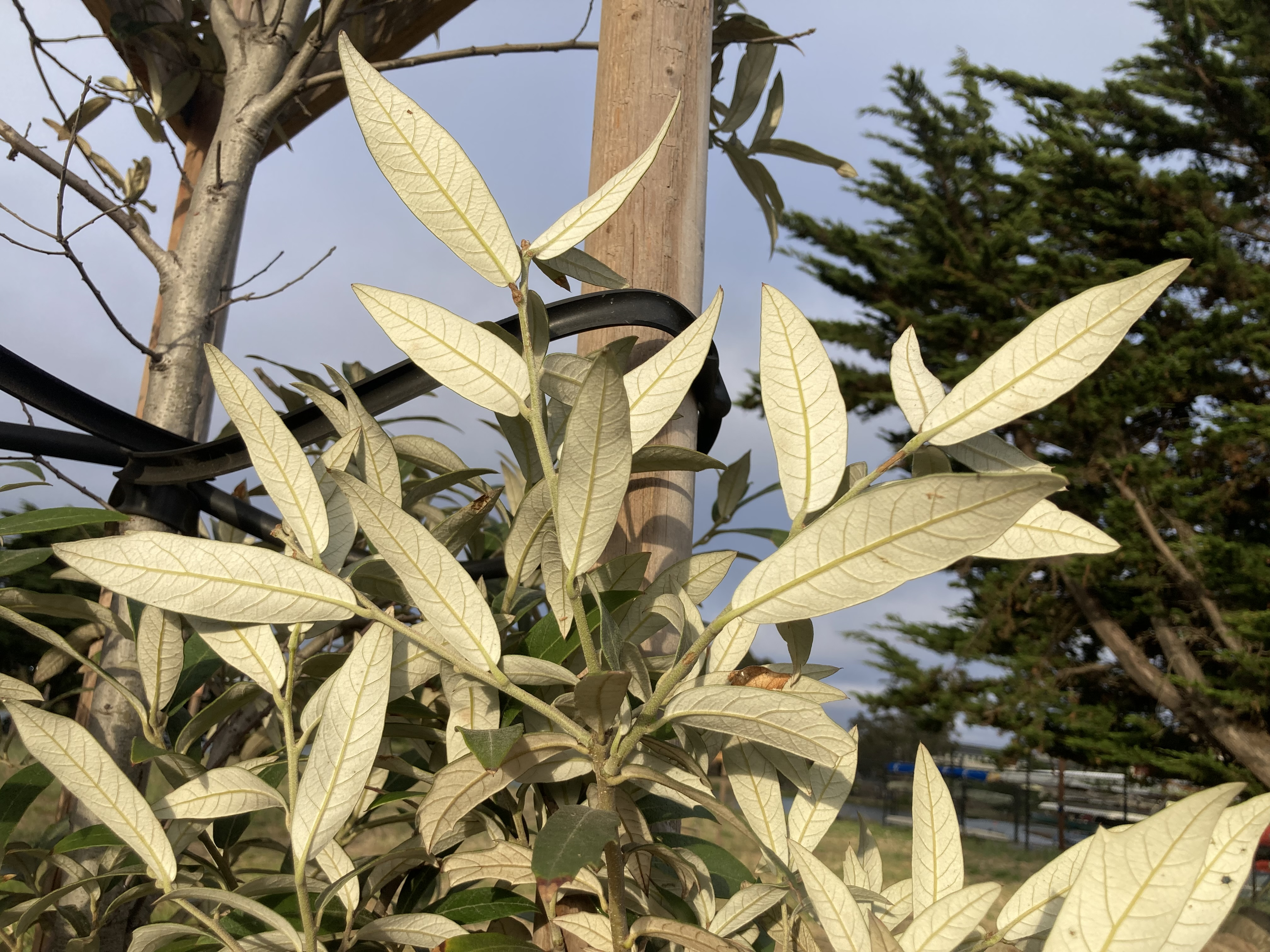
The white undersides show the origin of the plant's name

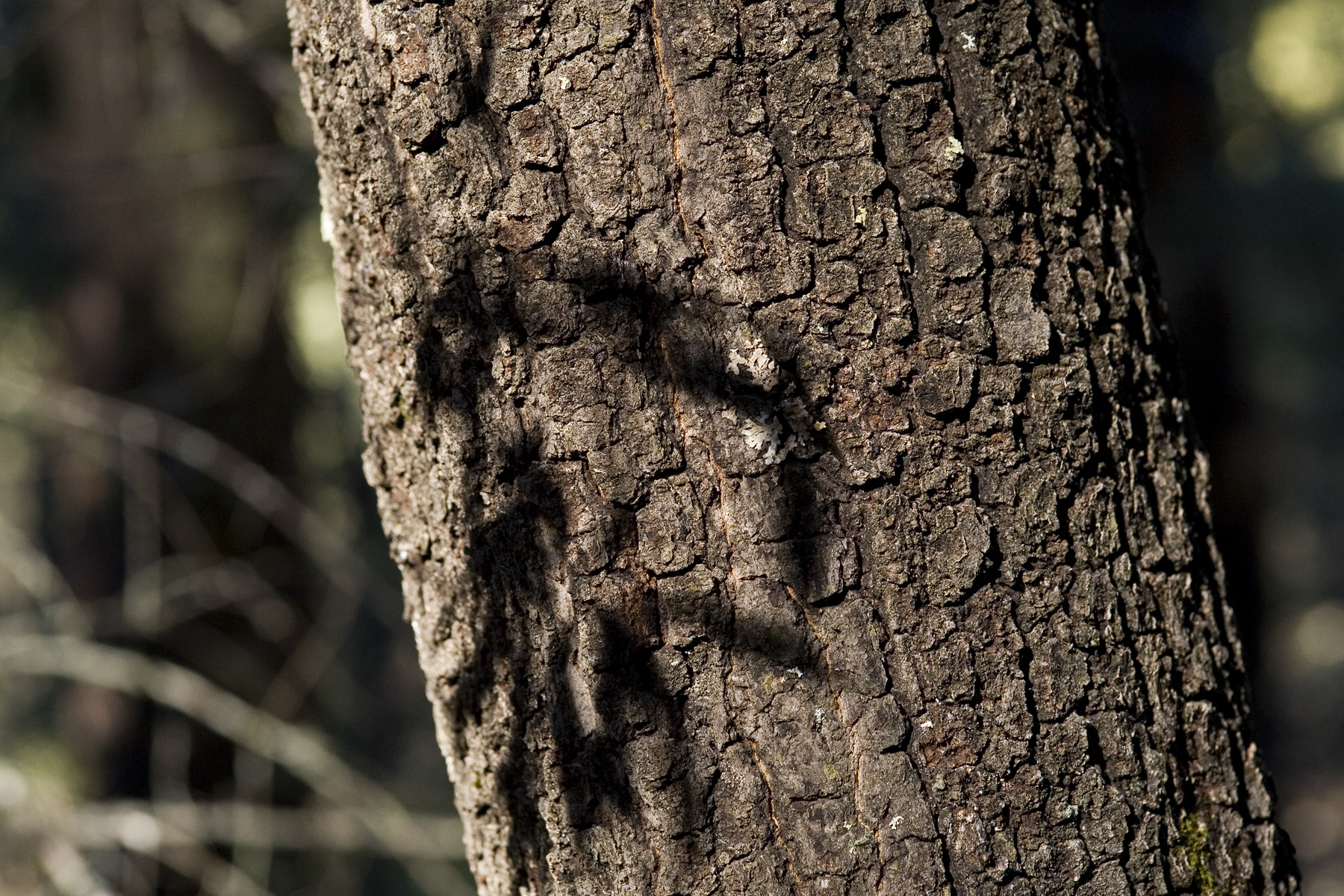
Bark texture
