= Cameraria cretaceella =

Scientific classification
- Kingdom: Animalia
- Phylum: Arthropoda
- Clade: Pancrustacea
- Class: Insecta
- Order: Lepidoptera
- Family: Gracillariidae
- Genus: Cameraria
- Species: C. cretaceella

Binomial name
- Cameraria cretaceella (Braun, 1925)

Synonyms
- Lithocolletis cretaceella Braun, 1925; Phyllonorycter cretaceella (Braun, 1925)

Species of moth

Cameraria cretaceella is a moth of the family Gracillariidae. It is known from Arizona and New Mexico, United States, but might occur more widely. It was moved from Phyllonorycter to Cameraria in a 2020 revision of these two genera.

The wingspan is 10.5 mm (0.41 in) for the holotype, a female. Cameraria cretaceella mines leaves of Quercus hypoleucoides (=Quercus hypoleuca), forming mines that appear as flat blotches on the upper surface of the leaf.
