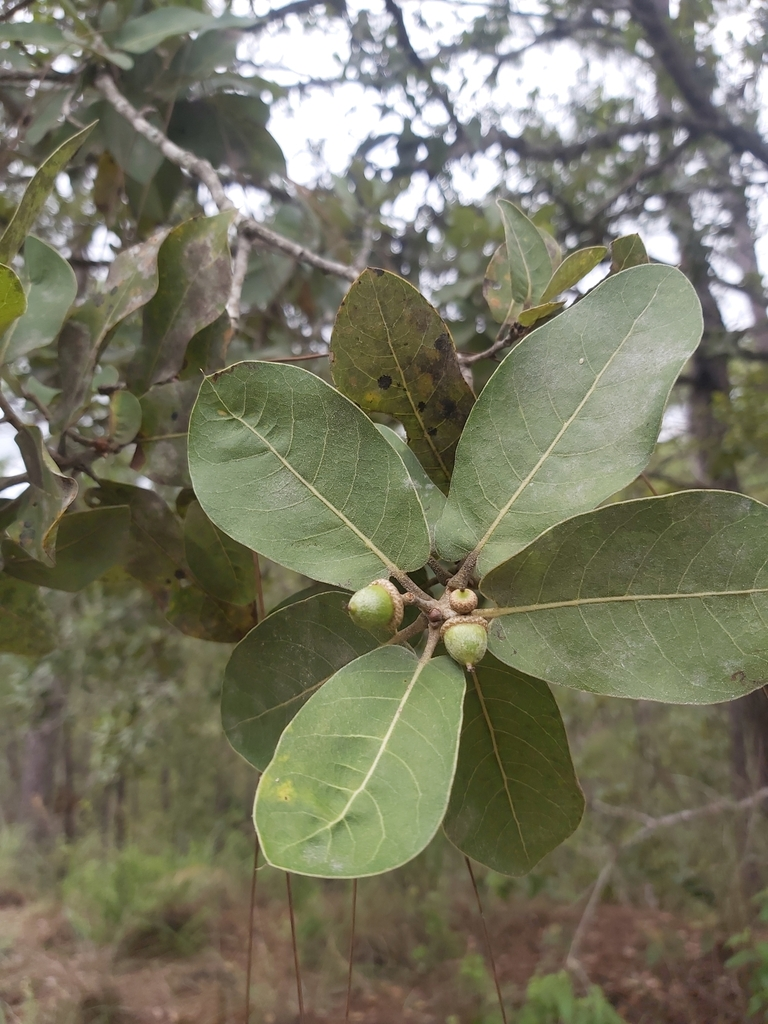

Conservation status
- Least Concern (IUCN 3.1)

Scientific classification
- Kingdom: Plantae
- Clade: Embryophytes
- Clade: Tracheophytes
- Clade: Spermatophytes
- Clade: Angiosperms
- Clade: Eudicots
- Clade: Rosids
- Order: Fagales
- Family: Fagaceae
- Genus: Quercus
- Subgenus: Quercus subg. Quercus
- Section: Quercus sect. Lobatae
- Species: Q. aristata

Binomial name
- Quercus aristata Hook. & Arn.

Synonyms
- Quercus productipes Trel.

= Quercus aristata =

Species of oak tree

Quercus aristata is a species of oak. It is native to western Mexico, found in Sinaloa, Nayarit, Jalisco, and Guerrero.

== Description ==
Quercus aristata is a short evergreen tree up to 12 metres (39 feet) tall with a trunk as much as 40 centimetres (16 inches) in diameter. The leaves are stiff and leathery, up to 12 cm long, often with sharp pointed teeth along the edges.
