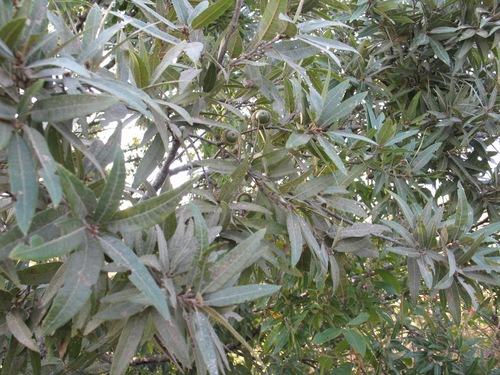

Conservation status
- Least Concern (IUCN 3.1)

Scientific classification
- Kingdom: Plantae
- Clade: Embryophytes
- Clade: Tracheophytes
- Clade: Spermatophytes
- Clade: Angiosperms
- Clade: Eudicots
- Clade: Rosids
- Order: Fagales
- Family: Fagaceae
- Genus: Quercus
- Subgenus: Quercus subg. Quercus
- Section: Quercus sect. Lobatae
- Species: Q. confertifolia

Binomial name
- Quercus confertifolia Bonpl.

Synonyms
- Quercus gentryi C.H.Mull.; Quercus mexicana var. confertifolia (Bonpl.) Wenz.; Quercus mexicana f. confertifolia (Bonpl.) Trel.; Quercus mexicana f. glabrata Trel., nom. illeg.

= Quercus confertifolia =

Species of plant

Quercus confertifolia, synonym Quercus gentryi, is a species of flowering plant in the family Fagaceae, native to northern and southwestern Mexico.

== Description ==
Under the synonym Quercus gentryi, the species was described as a short evergreen tree up to 15 metres (49 feet) tall with a trunk as much as 50 centimetres (20 inches) in diameter. The leaves are thick and rigid, up to 18 cm (7 in) long, with wavy edges but no teeth or lobes.

== Taxonomy ==
Quercus confertifolia was first described by Aimé Bonpland in 1810. Quercus confertifolia Torr., published in 1859 (and so a later homonym), has been used to refer to Quercus hypoleucoides.

Under the synonym Quercus gentryi, Denk et al. in 2017 placed the species in Quercus section Lobatae.
