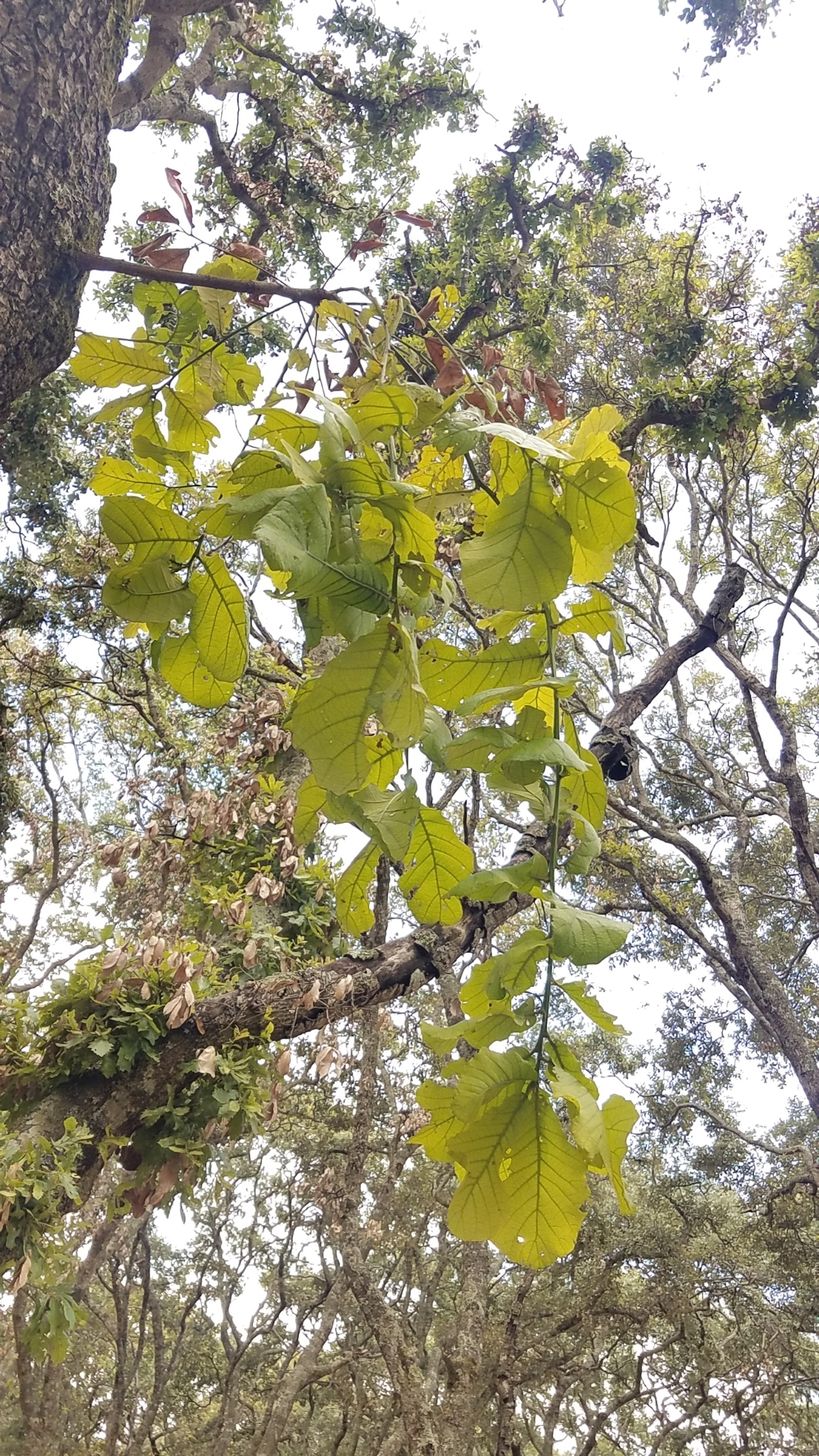

Conservation status
- Least Concern (IUCN 3.1)

Scientific classification
- Kingdom: Plantae
- Clade: Tracheophytes
- Clade: Angiosperms
- Clade: Eudicots
- Clade: Rosids
- Order: Fagales
- Family: Fagaceae
- Genus: Quercus
- Subgenus: Quercus subg. Quercus
- Section: Quercus sect. Quercus
- Species: Q. magnoliifolia

Binomial name
- Quercus magnoliifolia Née

Synonyms
- List: Quercus circinata Née; Quercus erubescens Trel.; Quercus flava Née ex Spreng.; Quercus haematophlebia Trel.; Quercus lutea Née; Quercus macrophylla Née; Quercus magnoliifolia var. lutea (Née) A.DC.; Quercus magnoliifolia var. macrophylla (Née) A.DC.; Quercus neoplatyphylla A.Camus; Quercus nudinervis Liebm.; Quercus rubescens Trel.; Quercus tepicana Trel.

= Quercus magnoliifolia =

Species of oak tree

Quercus magnoliifolia, also known as encino amarillo, encino avellano, encino bermejo, encino blanco, encino napis, encino prieto, and roble, is a Mexican species of oak. It is widespread along the Pacific Coast of Mexico from Sinaloa to Chiapas, and also found inland as far as Zacatecas and Puebla.

It was classified and described in 1801 by the French-Spanish botanist Luis Née.

Quercus magnoliifolia is a deciduous tree up to 20 metres (66 feet) tall with a trunk as much as 60 centimetres (24 inches) in diameter. The leaves are thick and leathery, up to 22 cm (8 1/2 in) long, widely egg-shaped, with wavy edges or sometimes shallow teeth, green on the top but covered with yellowish hairs on the underside.
