= Bosque de Nativitas Park, Xochimilco =

Park in Mexico City

Coordinates: 19°15′0″N 99°5′56″W

Bosque de Nativitas Park is located in the Mexico City borough of Xochimilco, just south of the Xochimilco Square and adjacent of one of the docks of the Xochimilco canals between Madreselva Street and the Xochimilco-Tulyehulaco highway. The park is 12.2 hectares with ash, pine and other temperate forest trees. Horseback riding is available here as well as picnic and barbecuing facilities.
