= María Bibiana Uribe =

Mexican beauty pageant winner

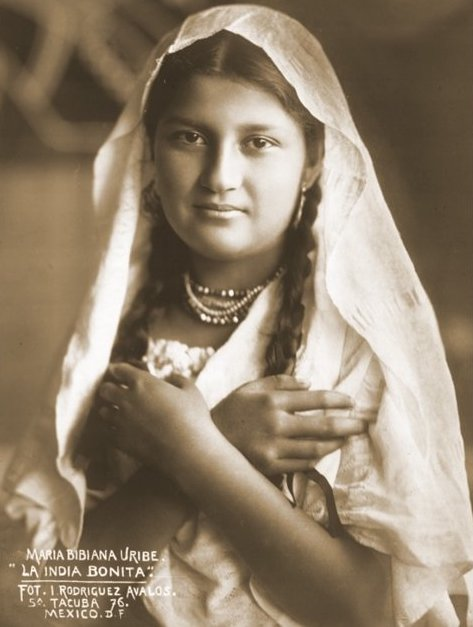
- Born: 1905; San Miguel Tenango, Huauchinango, Puebla
- Died: November 23, 1991 (aged 85–86)
- Beauty pageant titleholder
- Title: La India Bonita (1921)

María Bibiana Uribe Amaro (San Miguel Tenango, Huauchinango, Puebla, 1905 - November 23, 1999) was an Indigenous Mexican woman who gained national fame after winning Mexico's India Bonita beauty pageant in 1921. Born near Necaxa, Puebla, Uribe was sixteen when she won the contest. The India Bonita beauty pageant was founded in January 1921, when Félix Palavicini, the founder of El Universal, decided to celebrate the Mexican Centennial by hosting a contest to "bring greater attention and sympathy toward Indians as part of Mexico." The judges of the contest were Jorge Enciso (a pro-Native Mexican artist), Manuel Gamio (the Mexican anthropologist), and Rafael Pérez Taylor (the future head of Mexico's Federal Department of Fine Arts). The judges were advised to select the contest winner based on how closely she resembled the "Native ideal," including "dark skin, rounded facial features, [and] heavy eye-lids."

Though this recognition of Indigenous feminine beauty was recognized by some as part of a move toward a more racially-inclusive post-Porfiriato Mexico, contemporary scholars have noted institutionalizing such beauty standards on Mexican Native women "ultimately narrowed popular understandings of what it meant to be indigenous through focus on select visual markers of indigeneity." Uribe was selected as the winner of the contest, which immediately catapulted her into the national spotlight, and plays, songs, and poems were written in her honor. Uribe even attended a theater performance with President Álvaro Obregón and his wife as their guest of honor. Uribe faded into obscurity soon after winning the pageant, however, after she was found to be pregnant without being married. In 1987, she made a guest appearance on Televisa's Nuestro Mundo with Guillermo Ochoa.
