= Rigoberto Salgado Vázquez =

Mexican politician

- Born: 20 November 1969 (age 56); Mexico City, Mexico
- Occupations: Economist and politician
- Political party: MORENA

Rigoberto Salgado Vázquez (born 20 November 1969) is a Mexican economist and politician. Formerly associated with the Party of the Democratic Revolution (PRD), he was a founding member of the National Regeneration Movement (Morena).

In the 2009 mid-terms he was elected to the Chamber of Deputies to represent the Federal District's 27th electoral district (Tláhuac) for the PRD.

In 2015 he was elected mayor of the Mexico City borough of Tláhuac. In the 2024 general election he was elected to the Chamber of Deputies, representing Mexico City's 9th district (Tláhuac) for Morena.
