= 9th federal electoral district of Mexico City =

Federal electoral district of Mexico

Mexico City's 9th
- Electoral district of the Chamber of Deputies of Mexico

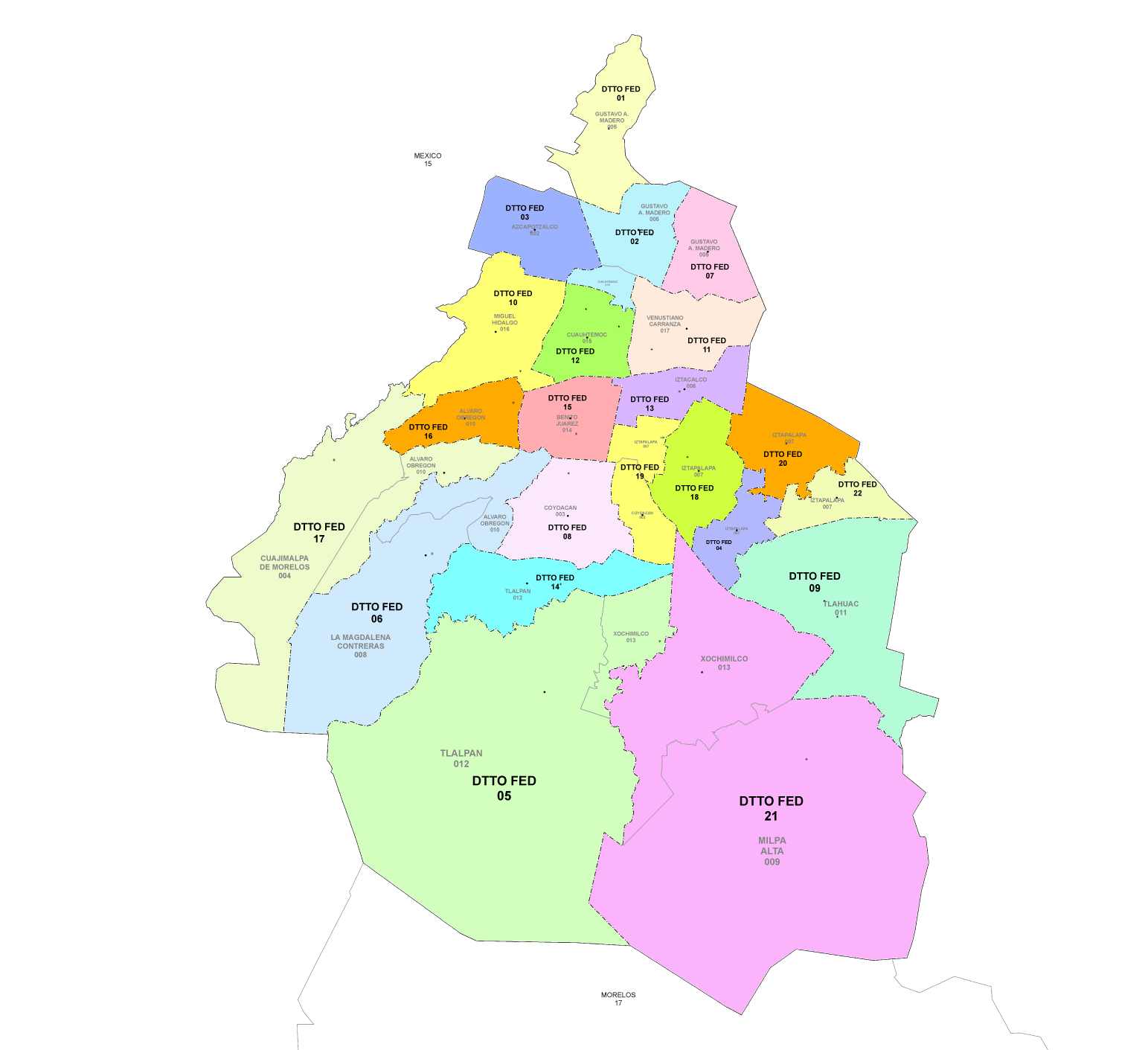
- 9th district since 2023

Incumbent
- Member: Rigoberto Salgado Vázquez
- Party: ▌Morena
- Congress: 66th (2024–2027)

District
- State: Mexico City
- Head town: Tláhuac
- Coordinates: 19°18′15″N 99°03′15″W
- Covers: Tláhuac
- PR region: Fourth
- Precincts: 145
- Population: 393,799 (2020 census)

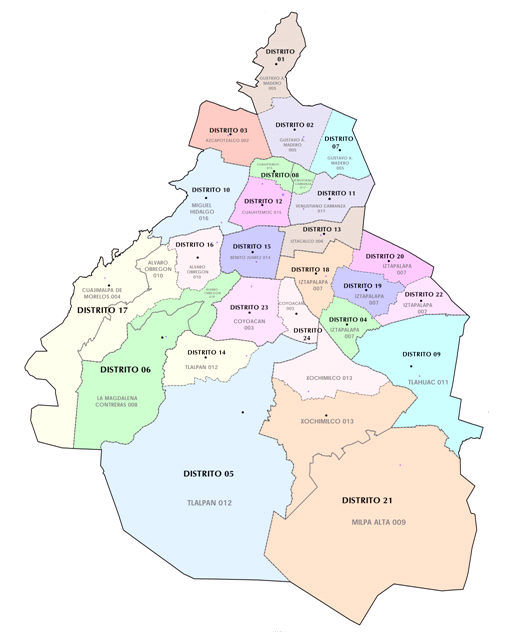
Mexico City under the 2017–2022 districting plan

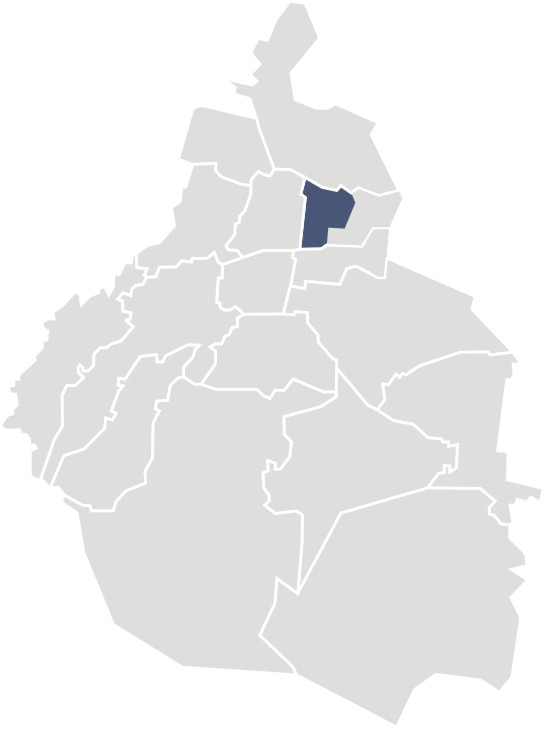
9th district in 2005–2017

The 9th federal electoral district of Mexico City (Spanish: Distrito electoral federal 09 de la Ciudad de México; previously "of the Federal District") is one of the 300 electoral districts into which Mexico is divided for elections to the federal Chamber of Deputies and one of 22 such districts in Mexico City.

It elects one deputy to the lower house of Congress for each three-year legislative session by means of the first-past-the-post system. Votes cast in the district also count towards the calculation of proportional representation ("plurinominal") deputies elected from the fourth region.

The current member for the district, elected in the 2024 general election, is Rigoberto Salgado Vázquez of the National Regeneration Movement (Morena).

== District territory ==
Under the 2023 districting plan adopted by the National Electoral Institute (INE), which is to be used for the 2024, 2027 and 2030 federal elections, the 9th district covers the 145 electoral precincts (secciones electorales) that make up the borough (alcaldía) of Tláhuac.

The district reported a population of 393,799 in the 2020 census.

== Previous districting schemes ==
Evolution of electoral district numbers
	1974	1978	1996	2005	2017	2023
Mexico City (Federal District)	27	40	30	27	24	22
Chamber of Deputies	196	300				

2017–2022

From 2017 to 2022, the district covered the whole of Tláhuac.

2005–2017

Under the 2005 districting scheme, the district covered the western portion of the borough (delegación) of Venustiano Carranza.

1996–2005

Between 1996 and 2005, the district covered the same basic area, with a slight reduction in its size.

1978–1996

The districting scheme in force from 1978 to 1996 was the result of the 1977 electoral reforms, which increased the number of single-member seats in the Chamber of Deputies from 196 to 300. Under that plan, the Federal District's seat allocation rose from 27 to 40. The 9th district covered parts of the boroughs of Azcapotzalco and Miguel Hidalgo.

== Deputies returned to Congress ==
(Mexico) National parties
- Current
- PAN
- PRI
- PT
- PVEM
- MC
- Morena
- PAZ
- Somos
- Defunct or local only
- PLM
- PNR
- PRM
- PNM
- PP
- PPS
- PARM
- PFCRN
- CON
- PANAL
- PSD
- PES
- PES
- PRD

Mexico City's 9th district
Election	Deputy	Party	Term	Legislature
1916	Antonio Norzagaray Ángulo		1916–1917	Constituent Congress of Querétaro
1917	Mauricio Gómez		1917–1918	27th Congress
1918	Ezequiel Ríos Landeros (Note: Ríos Landeros took office in November 1918.)	PLC	1918–1920	28th Congress
1920	Vacant		1920–1922	29th Congress
1922	Gustavo Arce Correa	PNC	1922–1924	30th Congress
1924	Justo A. Santa Anna		1924–1926	31st Congress
1926	Juan Lozano		1926–1928	32nd Congress
1928	Rafael Sánchez Lira	PLM	1928–1930	33rd Congress
1930	José Torres H.	Institutional Revolutionary Party	1930–1932	34th Congress
1932	Cosme Mier Riva-Palacio	Institutional Revolutionary Party	1932–1934	35th Congress
1934	Manuel Mier	Institutional Revolutionary Party	1934–1937	36th Congress
1937	Jesús Yurén Aguilar	Institutional Revolutionary Party	1937–1940	37th Congress
1940	Vacant		1940–1943	38th Congress
1943	Roberto Aguilera Carbajal	Institutional Revolutionary Party	1943–1946	39th Congress
1946	Manuel Origel Salazar	Institutional Revolutionary Party	1946–1949	40th Congress
1949	Uriel Herrera Estúa	Institutional Revolutionary Party	1949–1952	41st Congress
1952	Javier de la Riva Rodríguez	Institutional Revolutionary Party	1952–1955	42nd Congress
1955	Manuel Sierra Macedo	National Action Party (Mexico)	1955–1958	43rd Congress
1958	Arturo López Portillo	Institutional Revolutionary Party	1958–1961	44th Congress
1961	Mercedes Fernández Austri	Institutional Revolutionary Party	1961–1964	45th Congress
1964	Emilio Gandarilla Avilés	Institutional Revolutionary Party	1964–1967	46th Congress
1967	Javier Blanco Sánchez	National Action Party (Mexico)	1967–1970	47th Congress
1970	Aurora Fernández Fernández	Institutional Revolutionary Party	1970–1973	48th Congress
1973	Daniel Mejía Colín	Institutional Revolutionary Party	1973–1976	49th Congress
1976	Venustiano Reyes López	Institutional Revolutionary Party	1976–1979	50th Congress
1979	Gonzalo Castellot Madrazo	Institutional Revolutionary Party	1979–1982	51st Congress
1982	Arturo Contreras Cuevas	Institutional Revolutionary Party	1982–1985	52nd Congress
1985	José Armando Lazcano Montoya	Institutional Revolutionary Party	1985–1988	53rd Congress
1988	Magdaleno Gutiérrez Herrera	National Action Party (Mexico)	1988–1991	54th Congress
1991	Sandalio Alfonso Sáinz de la Maza Martínez	Institutional Revolutionary Party	1991–1994	55th Congress
1994	Irma Eugenia Cedillo y Amador	Institutional Revolutionary Party	1994–1997	56th Congress
1997	Victorio Montalvo Rojas	Party of the Democratic Revolution	1997–2000	57th Congress
2000	Daniel Ramírez del Valle	National Action Party (Mexico)	2000–2003	58th Congress
2003	María Guadalupe Morales Rubio	Party of the Democratic Revolution	2003–2006	59th Congress
2006	Victorio Montalvo Rojas	Party of the Democratic Revolution	2006–2009	60th Congress
2009	Esthela Damián Peralta	Party of the Democratic Revolution	2009–2012	61st Congress
2012	Israel Moreno Rivera	Party of the Democratic Revolution	2012–2015	62nd Congress
2015	Evelyn Parra Álvarez	Party of the Democratic Revolution	2015–2018	63rd Congress
2018	Adriana Espinosa de los Monteros García	National Regeneration Movement	2018–2021	64th Congress
2021	Guadalupe Chavira de la Rosa	National Regeneration Movement	2021–2024	65th Congress
2024	Rigoberto Salgado Vázquez	National Regeneration Movement	2024–2027	66th Congress

== Presidential elections ==
Mexico City's 9th district
Election	District won by	Party or coalition	%
2018	Andrés Manuel López Obrador	Juntos Haremos Historia	67.9434
2024	Claudia Sheinbaum Pardo	Sigamos Haciendo Historia	66.4254
