= Israel Moreno Rivera =

Mexican politician

- Born: 17 March 1975 (age 51); Cuauhtémoc, D.F., Mexico
- Occupation: Deputy
- Political party: PRD

Israel Moreno Rivera (born 17 March 1975) is a Mexican politician affiliated with the Party of the Democratic Revolution (PRD). In 2012–2015 he served as a federal deputy in the 62nd Congress, representing the Federal District's ninth district.
