= Victorio Montalvo Rojas =

Mexican lawyer and politician

President of the Chamber of Deputies
- In office 31 May 1999 – 31 August 1999
- Preceded by: Juan Moisés Callejas Castañón
- Succeeded by: Carlos Medina Plascencia

Personal details
- Born: 8 December 1966 (age 59) Mexico City, Mexico
- Party: PRD
- Education: National Autonomous University of Mexico
- Occupation: Lawyer and politician

Victorio Rubén Montalvo Rojas (born 8 December 1966) is a Mexican lawyer and politician affiliated with the Party of the Democratic Revolution. He served as a federal deputy during the 57th Congress (1997–2000) and again in the 60th Congress (2006–2009), on both occasions representing the Federal District's ninth district for the PRD.

He served also as President of the Chamber of Deputies from 31 May to 31 August 1999.
