= 2004 Tláhuac lynching =

Lynching of 3 police officers

Coordinates: 19°13′59″N 99°00′08″W

- Location: San Juan Ixtayopan, Tláhuac, Mexico City, Mexico
- Date: 23 November 2004; 6 PM – 9 PM (UTC−06:00)
- Victims: Cristóbal Bonilla Martín, Edgar Moreno Nolasco, and Víctor Mireles Barrera
- Motive: Accusations of child kidnapping

On 23 November 2004, three plainclothes Federal Preventative Police (PFP) officers, Cristóbal Bonilla Martín, Edgar Moreno Nolasco, and Víctor Mireles Barrera, were lynched in San Juan Ixtayopan, Tláhuac, a borough of Mexico City, after they were accused of kidnapping two children from a local elementary school. Moreno was eventually extracted by riot police and sent to the hospital, where he remained in a coma for around a month; Mireles and Bonilla were both killed, with their bodies being doused in gasoline and set alight. The next day, at least 32 people were arrested in an operation by the Federal Investigations Agency.

The lynching was almost uniformly condemned, sparking discussion concerning Mexico's justice system and vigilantism. Criticism was especially levied at law enforcement's sluggish response to the incident, resulting in the dismissal of several high-ranking officials, including Marcelo Ebrard, then Mexico City's chief of police.

== Background ==
Due to rampant distrust of authorities stemming from widespread corruption, lynchings became frequent across Mexico during the 1990s. From 1984 to 2001, there were 186 attempted lynchings across Mexico, with 75 occurring in 1993–95. This trend continued to a lesser extent into the 2000s. A 2004 survey done by the Latin American Public Opinion Project found that up to 30% of Mexicans professed support for vigilante justice.

Most lynchings took place in Mexico City, particularly in the eastern boroughs. At the time, an average of 478 crimes were being reported in the city per day, with some experts believing that "the real figures could be five times as high, since most people are reluctant to report crime".

== Lynching ==
Around 6 PM CST (UTC−06:00) on 23 November 2004, dressed in plainclothes and driving an unmarked gray Ford Focus, PFP warrant officers Cristóbal Bonilla Martín and Edgar Moreno Nolasco, both under the command of sub-inspector Víctor Mireles Barrera, were sent to survey a local candy business thought to be linked to drug trafficking. They reportedly saw a woman leave the house and head for the nearby Popol Vuh Primary School, resulting in Mireles getting out of the car and following her. He took several photos as he went, arousing the suspicion of parents who had arrived to pick up their children. Mireles then ran back to the car.

Moreno then left the car so as to record the school's name and was quickly surrounded and questioned by locals. He initially responded that he only wanted to buy juice, before being suddenly accused of kidnapping two children from the school and bound. Mireles and Bonilla were then dragged out of their car and bound as well, before who Moreno described as "several subjects who looked like gang members" began to beat them.

Televisa and TV Azteca, two of Mexico's major mass media companies, broadcast the lynching live, with the mob even allowing reporters to interview the officers so they could "confess their crimes". Moreno eventually managed to free one of his arms, take out his cell phone, and with the crowd's permission, call his superiors. Fátima Mena Ortega, the Tláhuac borough chief, soon arrived with two police officers, but left after being threatened. The beatings continued for between two and three hours with little further intervention from authorities.

Mireles and Bonilla were both doused in gasoline and set on fire by 9 PM, while Moreno was dragged away from the school to a lamp post near the town's newspaper kiosk. There, he was recovered by GERI (Spanish: Grupo Especial de Reacción Inmediata), the tactical unit of Mexico City's Judicial Police, and sent to Xoco Hospital. Tear gas was released in order to disperse the lynchers.

== Aftermath ==
Mireles and Bonilla were both buried on 25 November, the former in Mexico City and the latter in Santiago de Querétaro. In 2018, their relatives received the Caballero Águila (lit. 'Eagle Knight'), the highest award given to the relatives of deceased police officers.

Moreno was transferred to the Hospital Central Militar Mexico on 25 November, where he fell into a coma which lasted until New Year's Eve. He wasn't able to walk again until mid-January 2005. Following his discharge, he lived in Querétaro for a time, before moving to Madrid, where he worked as a guard at the Mexican embassy there. He returned to Mexico in 2012, continuing to work in law enforcement; as of 2018, he was commissioner of the Federal Police's science division.

=== Criminal proceedings ===
==== Operation Cyclone ====
On the night of 24 November 2004, in what was codenamed Operation Cyclone, more than 300 agents of the Federal Investigations Agency arrested at least 32 suspects. Alicia "La Gorda" Zamora Luna and Eduardo Torres Montes, identified as the lynching's main instigators, evaded capture.

Controversy arose concerning agents' conduct throughout the operation, as units entered homes without search warrants and reportedly looted and destroyed property. Suspects Martín Andrés García and Edgar Molotla were both severely beaten once detained, sustaining injuries which their families believe contributed to their deaths in police custody years later.

== Reactions ==
Many residents of Tláhuac were ashamed of the incident and emphasized that the actions of the lynch mob did not represent the community as a whole. An unnamed man reportedly said the following day, "We do not justify yesterday's acts, we do not agree, but it is not fair to generalize... because of a few they point the finger at us all, but we are not a town of murderers". There existed, however, a vocal minority which justified the lynching.

Cardinal Norberto Rivera Carrera, in an interview with El Informador, said that the lynching occurred "due to the climate of violence that we experience in Mexico" and that all sectors of society held partial responsibility. Furthermore, he commented "It is good to ask for justice, but it is also good to study the roots, the causes that are leading our society to such unpleasant violence."

=== Government ===
Members of the three major political parties at the time (PAN, PRD, and PRI) condemned the lynching. La Jornada, which separately interviewed 10 politicians following the lynching said all of them "agreed, with their nuances, that it [was] unjustifiable..." and "declared that the law should be applied against those responsible and that this crime should not go unpunished."

José Luis Soberanes, the president of the National Human Rights Commission, stated that the lynching "call[ed] into question the institutions of prosecution and administration of justice and shock[ed] the rule of law." The Human Rights Commission of Mexico City shared similar sentiments, stating that it "show[ed] the repercussions that impunity can have in other acts of lynching that have occurred in our city, in which the authorities have not sought justice and those responsible have not been tried."

==== Dismissals ====
The Secretariat of Citizen Security of Mexico City was heavily criticized for its perceived passiveness throughout the lynching; claims of high traffic preventing a more effective response were brushed aside by commentators. This resulted in a political spat between President Vicente Fox and Mayor Andrés Manuel López Obrador, the latter defending the department and its head, future Secretary of Foreign Affairs Marcelo Ebrard.

Eventually, on 7 December 2004, President Fox announced that Ebrard, alongside PFP commissioner José Luis Figueroa, had been dismissed. The same day, Secretary of Public Security Ramón Martín Huerta dismissed another eight high-ranking officials. Ebrard went on local radio and denounced his dismissal, calling it a "serious error", while López Obrador said he would abide by the president's order despite not agreeing with it.
