= San Andrés Mixquic =

Community in Tláhuac, Mexico City

- Neighborhood
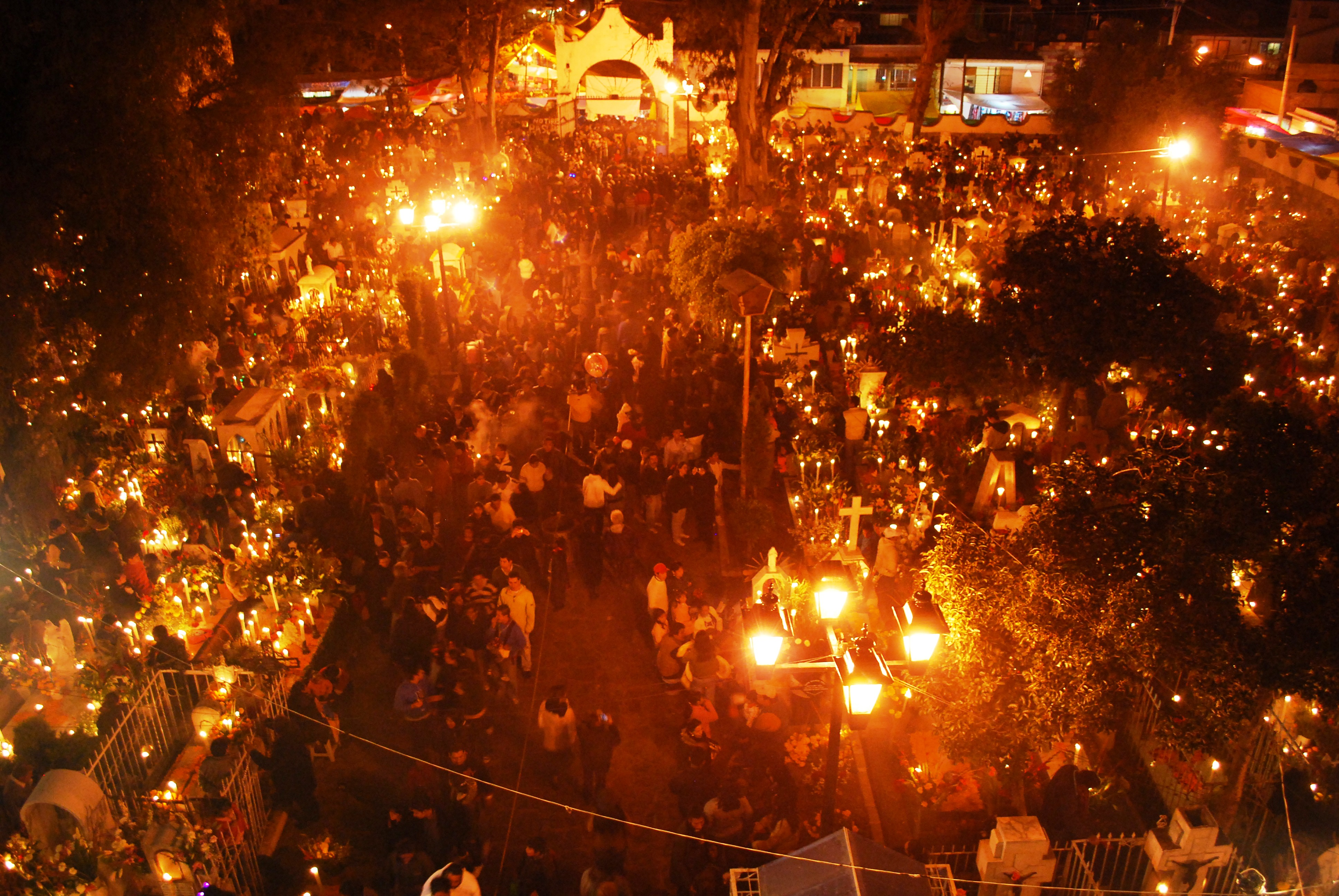
- Cemetery in front of church during the Alumbrada
- Interactive map of San Andrés Mixquic
- Coordinates: 19°13′29.69″N 98°57′51.43″W
- Country: Mexico
- City: Mexico City
- Borough: Tláhuac

San Andres Míxquic is a community located in the southeast of the Distrito Federal (Mexico City) in the borough of Tláhuac. The community was founded by the 11th century on what was a small island in Lake Chalco. “Míxquic” means “in mesquite” but the community's culture for most of its history was based on chinampas, gardens floating on the lake's waters and tied to the island. Drainage of Lake Chalco in the 19th and 20th century eventually destroyed the chinampas but the community is still agricultural in nature, despite being officially in the territory of Mexico City.

San Andres Míxquic is best known for its Day of the Dead commemorations, which consist of both ritual and cultural events lasting from 31 October to 2 November. These events draw thousands of Mexican and international visitors, and culminate in the Alumbrada, when the cemetery that surrounds the community's main church glows with thousands of candles and smoke from incense the evening of 2 November. This community was designated as a "Barrio Mágico" by the city in 2011.

== History ==
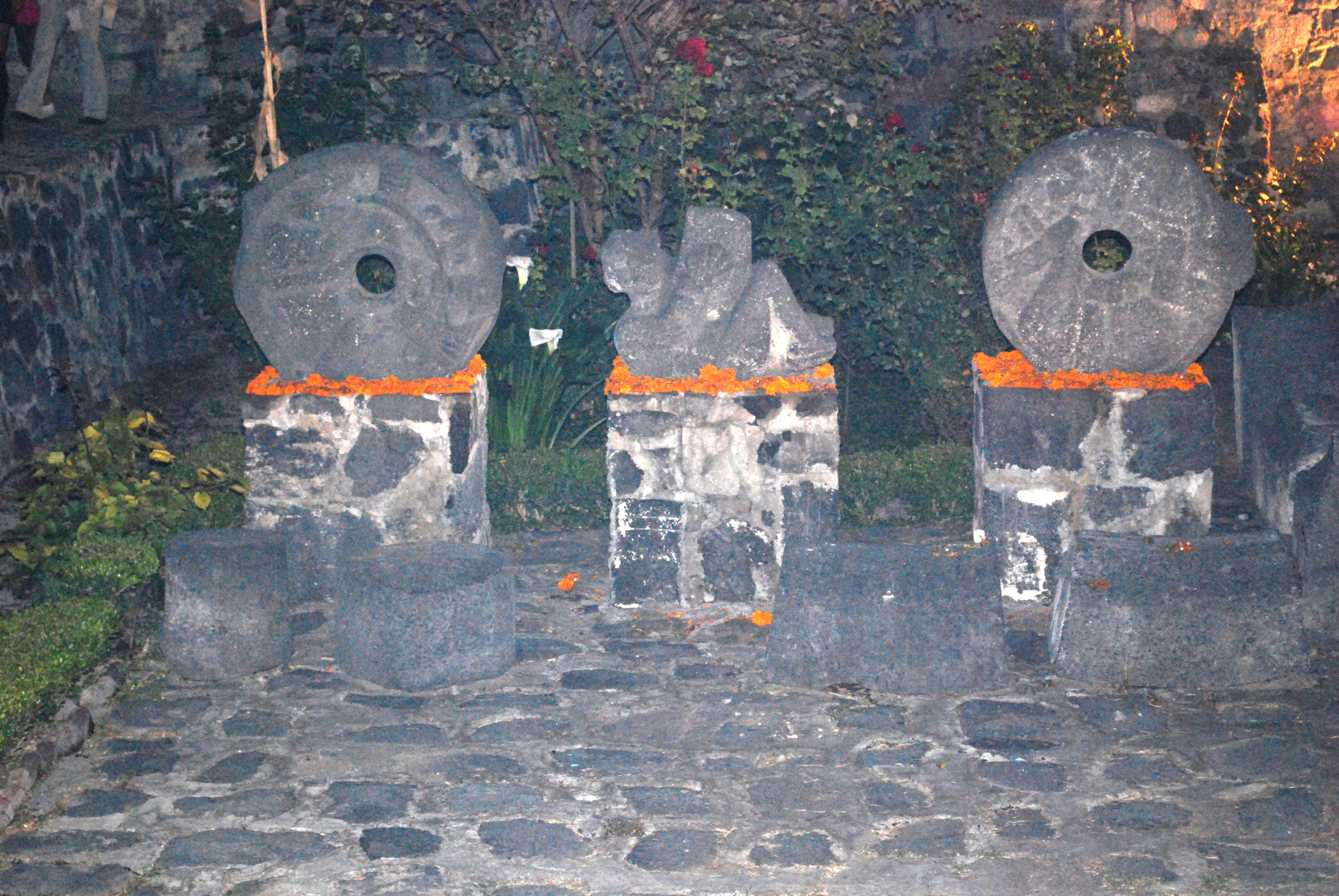
Pre-Hispanic stone rings and Chac Mool at the ex monastery

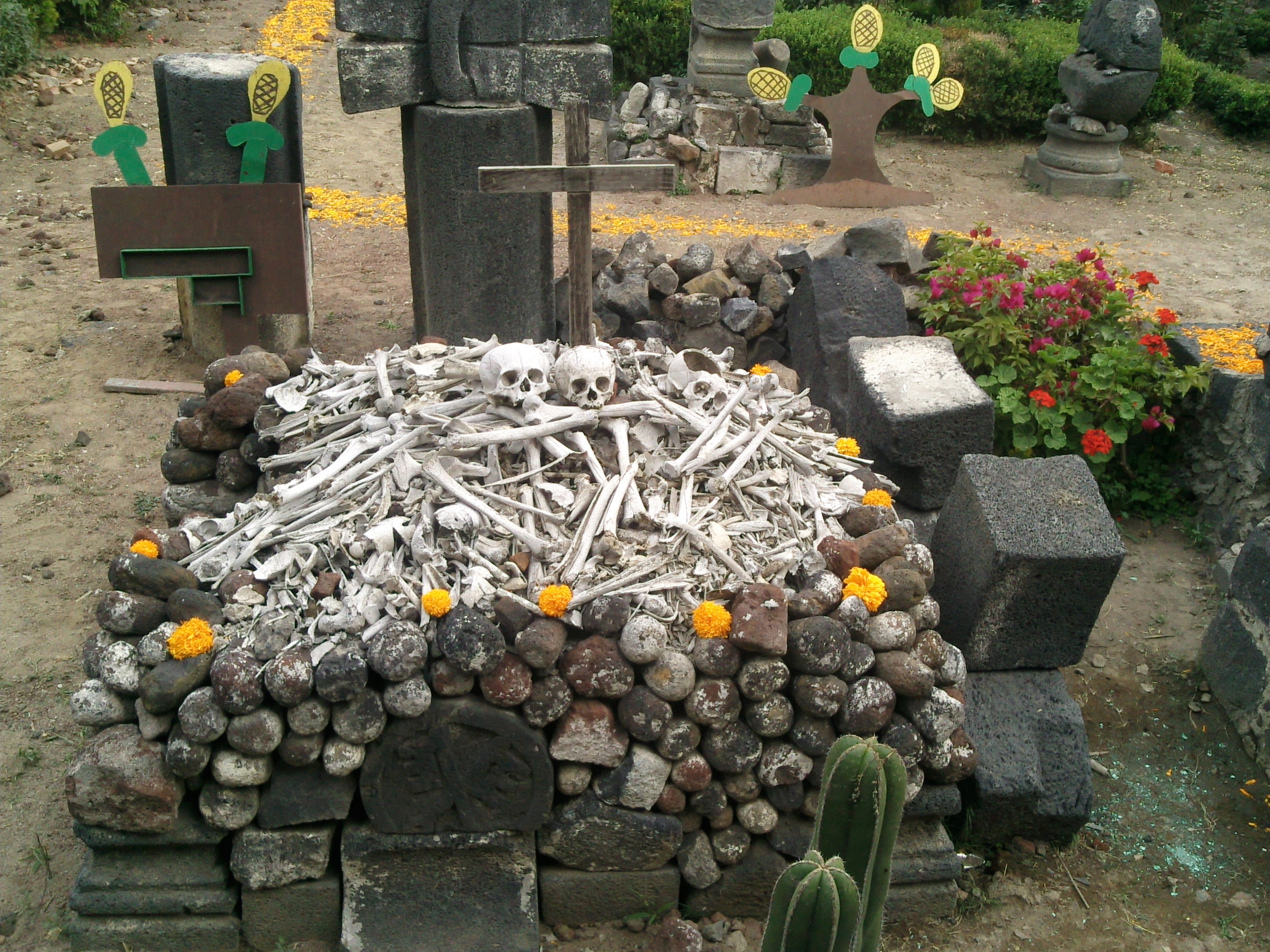
Real human bones from the past decorated for Day of the Dead at the former monastery

The community of Mixquic was most likely founded around the 11th century by people who migrated here from Xochimilco. In the pre-Hispanic period, Mixquic was a small island in Lake Chalco, around which the inhabitants built chinampas or floating gardens. Originally the community was an independent dominion whose rulers claimed Toltec descent and patronized the god Quetzalcoatl, but because of its location in prime chinampa territory, it was subsequently subdued by Xochimilco, Chalco, Azcapotzalco and finally Tenochtitlan in 1432. Bernal Diaz del Castillo describes Mixquic in his True History of the Conquest of New Spain as full of white towers and temples and was initially named by the Spaniards “Venezuela” for its similarity to Venice. Hernán Cortés subdued this area on 20 May 1521, after which soldiers from Mixquic helped subdue Tenochtitlan, with which they had had bad relations.

During the colonial era, this area was initially under direct control of the Spanish Crown. Later it became an encomienda, and remained so until the 17th century. Between 1536 and 1563, the monastery of San Andres Apostol was constructed here by friars Jorge de Avila and Geronimo de San Esteban. The community of Mixquic became the ecclesiastical seat for the surrounding area.

In 1833, four crosses were placed in the following neighborhoods, San Agustín, San Miguel, San Bartolomé and Los Reyes, forming a rectangle that was the original dimensions of the main church's atrium/cemetery. This was later modified by 1860 due to the Reform Laws, in part to allow for the construction of the Cristóbal Colon Primary School and the Andrés Quintana Roo Library. In the second half of the 19th century, the first project to drain Lake Chalco was undertaken. However, the endeavor would not be finished until the era of Porfirio Diaz in the late 19th century and early 20th.

The village of Mixquic became integrated with the Mexico City area in 1898, which would have long-term implications, as city authorities would have control over the community's resources, in particular, its water. In 1916, during the Mexican Revolution, the monastery was occupied by forces loyal to Venustiano Carranza. In the first half of the 20th century, the community managed to preserve many of its chinampas using well water but by the 1960s, this was no longer feasible, ending the community's lake culture. However, farming is still a major economic activity here and is the main producer of vegetables in the Federal District. The community is about three km2 with most of it used for agricultural purposes. Over half of this land is ejido. Most of the produce is sold at the giant Centro de Abastos food market in the city.

Life is changing for the community as it becomes more integrated with Mexico City proper. More private vehicles and more public transportation is available, leading more of the community's younger generation to seek employment in the city and/or further their education at university.

== The village ==
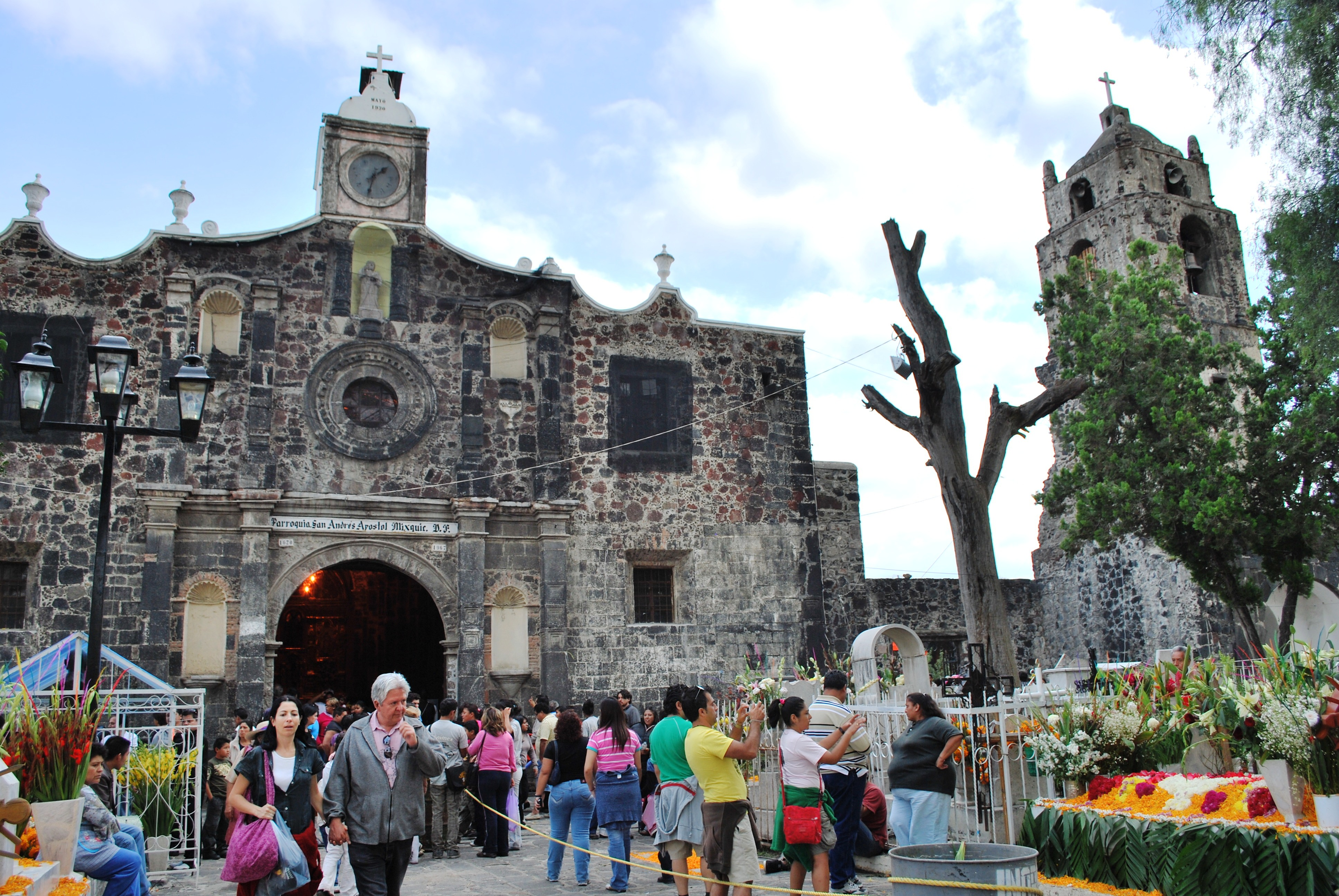
Church of San Andres Apostol

The center of the village is the church and ex-monastery of San Andres Apostol. Between 1536 and 1563, the monastery was constructed here by friars Jorge de Avila and Geronimo de San Esteban. The church and monastery was built over the teocalli, or sacred precinct of Mixquic. The first church was demolished with only the original bell tower remaining. The current church dates from 1600, built with three naves and a cupola, but it is separate from the bell tower of the original church. The old monastery has walls which are 90 cm thick constructed of tezontle. In 1932, the church and monastery complex was declared a historic monument.

In the courtyard of the old monastery, there are a number of pre-Hispanic archeological finds on display. The first is a sculpture of Miquiztli or Mixquixtli, the goddess of life and death. Another significant find is a Chac Mool which is displayed between two rings from the old Mesoamerican ballcourt. Lastly are columns with figures of Quetzalcoatl and skulls sculpted from volcanic stone.

The Andres Quintana Roo Library is also the town's site museum. This museum has fourteen glass cases containing 279 pieces from the old teocalli and other areas in and around Mixquic. The archeological collection that the museum holds was donated by Socorro Bernal Roque, a native of the village. Most of the pieces are of clay and stone and most belong to the late post-classic period(1200–1500) but some pieces belong to the Toltec and Teotihuacan cultures. Among the pieces that stand out are a chac mool, vestiges of a teotlachtli, clay and stone seals, a coiled serpent and other snakes, a tzompantli and a calendar that was hollowed out to make it into a baptismal font.

A small area with canals and chinampas still exists near the town.

Members of the Legislative Assembly of the Distrito Federal (Mexico City) are demanding that the mayor of the city solicit the community as a World Heritage Site. They claim that the area has physical characteristics and environmental impact that is unique in the world. The area is of importance to migrating birds and is a recharge zone for local aquifers. The main church's cemetery and archeological site which World Heritage Site status would help preserve and promote its cultural value.

== Day of the Dead celebrations ==
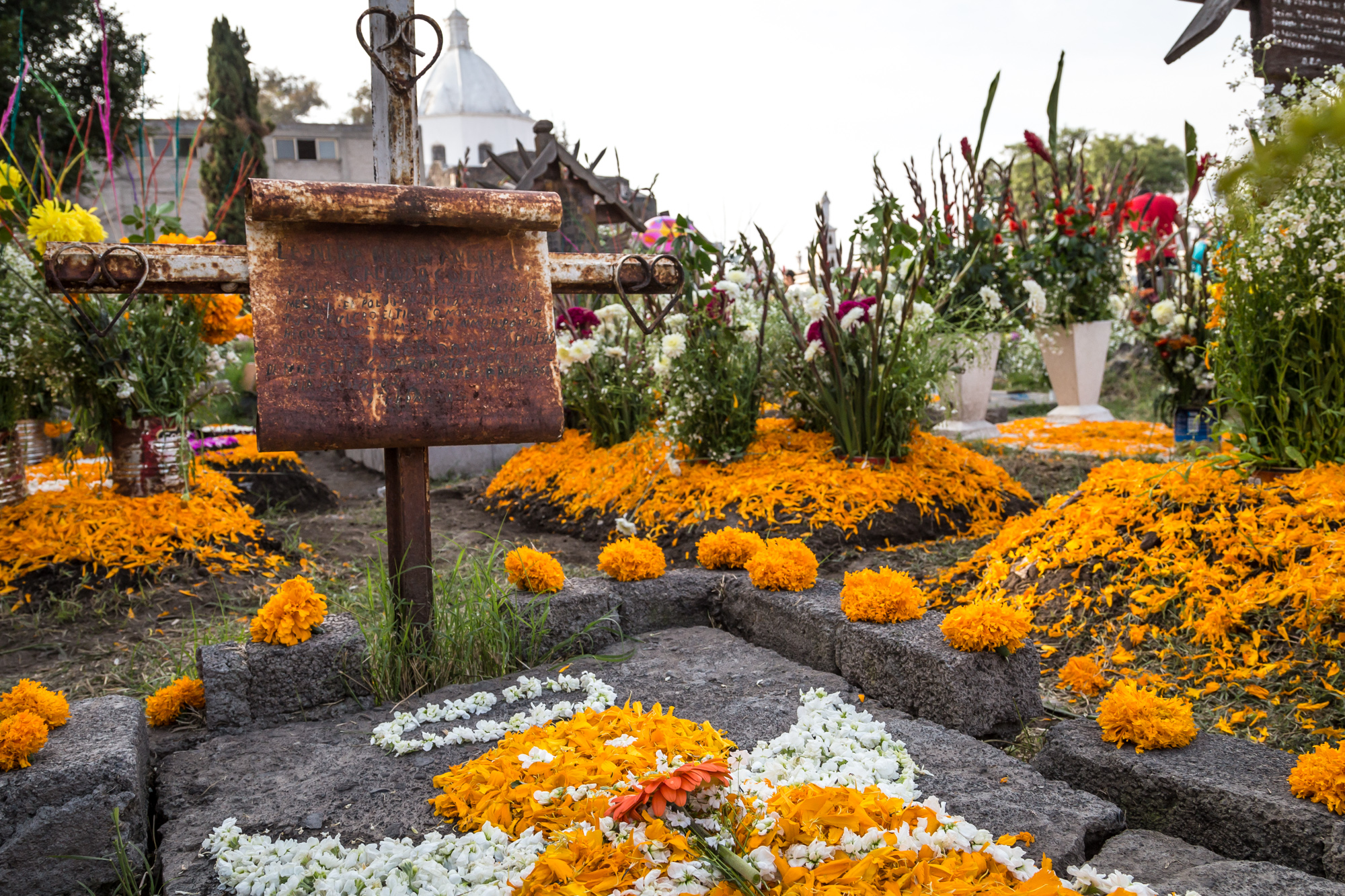
The church cemetery decorated with cempasúchil.

Day of the Dead is the most important celebration in this community, with two days of ritual and cultural events from November 1 to 2. The village and its church graveyard has become famous in the Mexico City metropolitan area for this. In and around the cemetery, thousands of Mexican and international visitors experience the sights, sound and smells of the rituals, cultural events and stands selling food, crafts and other items. The modern celebrations are an extension of the cult of the dead that existed here since pre-Hispanic times. Excavations in this area have revealed a large quantity of stone skulls that used to adorn the facades of homes in this area. Solemn commemoration and festivities do not compete here; both are considered part of the event. In addition to the traditional altars to the dead called “ofrendas”, grave cleanings and decoration, there are also plays, processions, poetry readings, concerts and folk dance. In 2009, the finale was a concert by Susana Harp.

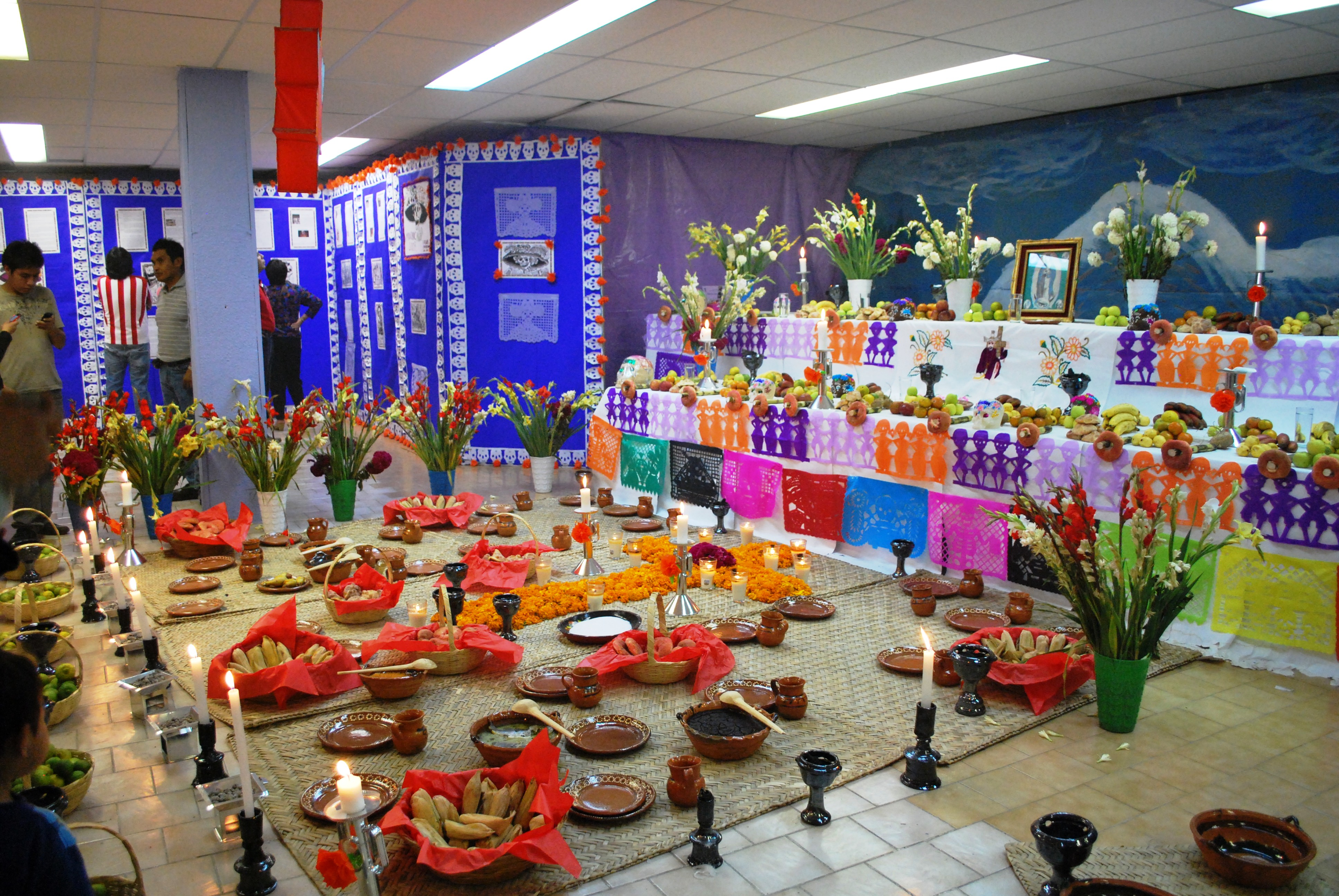
Giant ofrenda at the library/museum

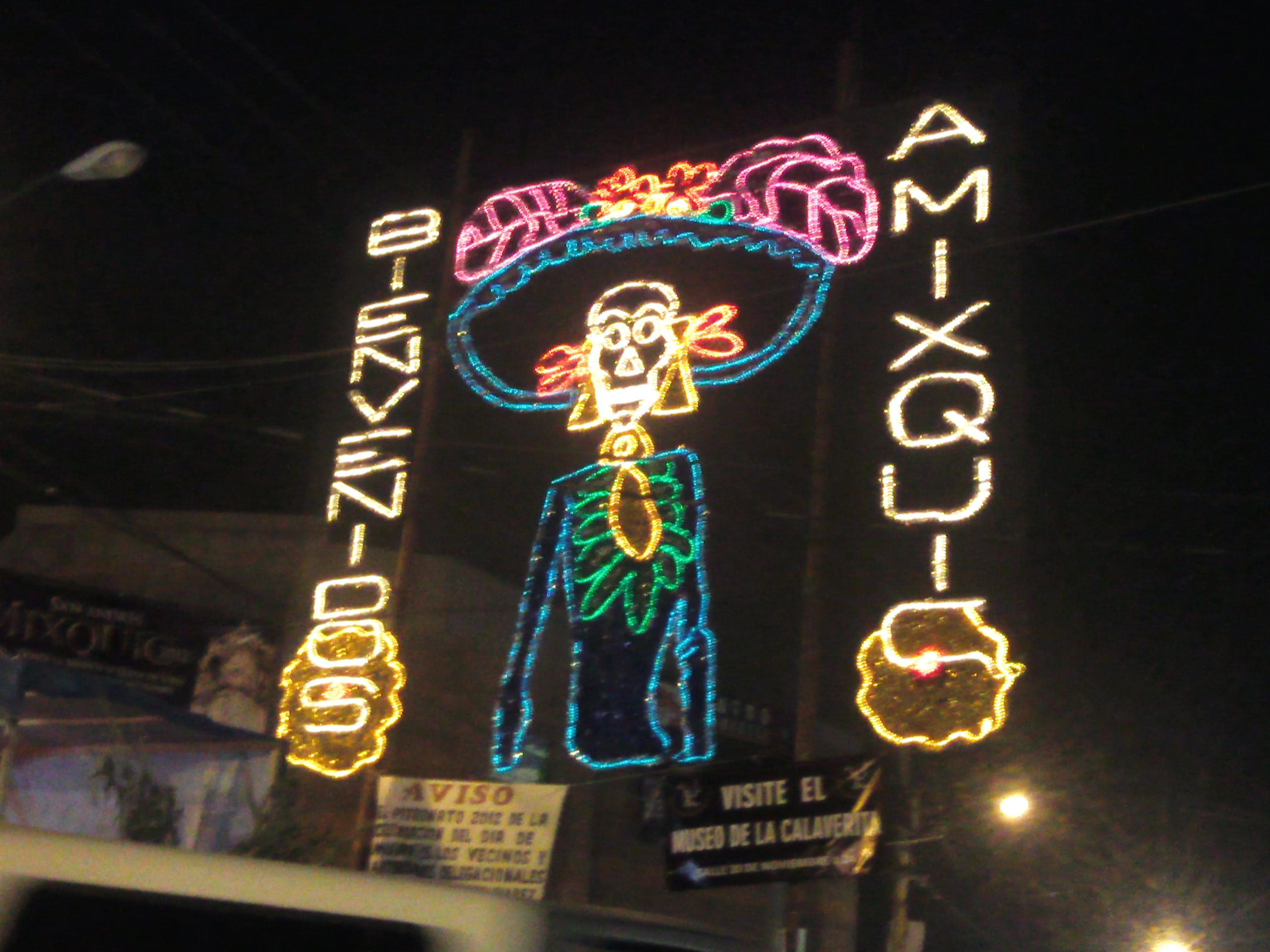
Illuminated sign welcoming visitors to Day of the Dead activities

Preparations for this celebration can begin two or three months in advance, when families begin to buy plates and utensils that will be used only for ofrendas and women embroider napkins and tablecloths for the occasion. In mid-October, residents place a large paper star lantern over their doorways, which will remain until November 3. The purpose of this star is to help guide the dead who come back to visit. In the days leading up to the Day of the Dead, fields around the community that have been planted with cempoalxóchitl bloom and the fragrance can be detected. Other aromas, such as those of fruits in season and pan de muerto have given rise to the expression “ya huele a muertos”(now it smells like the dead) or “ya se siente muertitos” (now the dear (lit. little) dead can be felt) indicating that Day of the Dead is near. In the public primary schools, students and teachers arrange Day of the Dead altars, called ofrendas, with the teachers arranging the school's large altar and students creating miniature ones, sometimes with themes. These are placed on public display, with the ofrendas of the Cristobal Colon Primary School the most visited due to the school's location near the church. Days before celebrations begin, tomb cleaning and repair commences.

The final preparations take place on October 30 with family ofrendas laid out in homes. Families have their own variations on the ritual but some things are common, the offerings of bread, flowers, candles, a container with water paired with a container of salt, incense and photographs. For the most part, the ritual is a mixture of pre-Hispanic and Catholic rites, with the addition of photographs being a modern touch. Mostly these offerings are made privately in homes on altars arranged for this day, but elements can be seen at the cemetery on the graves. One element that is local is a donut-shaped bread with a dark pink glaze called “roscas rosas” that are laid out along with pan de muertos. People open their doors here to invite the dead to visit.

From 31 October to 2 November, friends and family will come and visit the ofrendas. These visitors will bring items for the ofrendas, generally things that the deceased liked in life. As the visitors come by, the ofrenda grows. Hosts reciprocate by offering food and drink to the visitors.

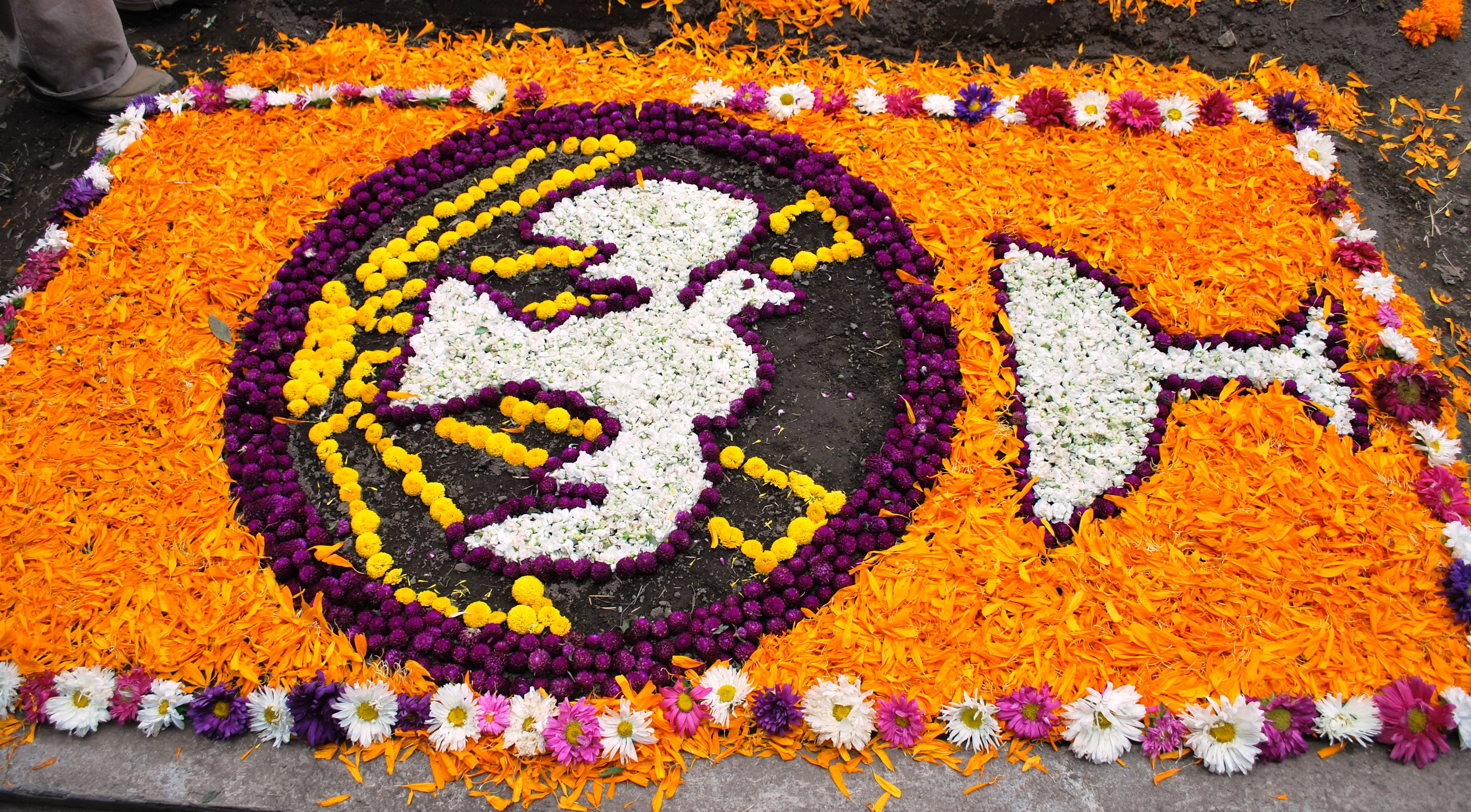
Grave decorated with flower petals

At midnight of 31 October the church bells signal the arrival of the souls of children who have departed. Ofrendas to children are often decorated with brightly colored toys. One traditional toy is a dog named Izcuincle (Nahuatl for dog) because it guides the children over the river Chiconauhuapan to enter Mictlán (realm of the dead). For this day, no offering should be left for adults as it is believed that the children get angry and sad if this occurs. In the morning of November 1, a breakfast is laid on the ofrenda. From the outside to this ofrenda is a trail of a white flower called “alhelí”, which symbolizes the purity of these souls. The souls of children visit from midnight of 31 October to mid-day on 1 November. At this time, when “after the sun passes its zenith,” local belief holds that the “souls of the children return to Mictlán” and the souls of the adults arrive and stay through 2 November.

When night falls on 1 November, the air fills with the music of tropical and mariachi groups. There is also a contest among skulls that have been fabricated from cardboard, painted and inscribed with satire, tall tales and jokes. A mock funeral procession comes through featuring a supposed widow who shouts picaresque phrases at the crowd about the loss of her husband being carried in a casket. The procession moves toward the graveyard and helpers solicit contributions for the “burial” making jokes with the attendees. When they arrive to the graveyard, instead of burying the supposed husband, he jumps out of the coffin and runs off terrified among the crowd causing laughter.

At seven pm on November 1, the church bells ring again, signaling the beginning of the Hour of Campanera. Groups of youths wander from house to house carrying bells and sing "a las ánimas benditas les prendemos sus ceritas. Campanero, mi tamal" (to the blessed souls we light our candles. Campanero, my tamale) . After which they receive tamales, candy or fruit.

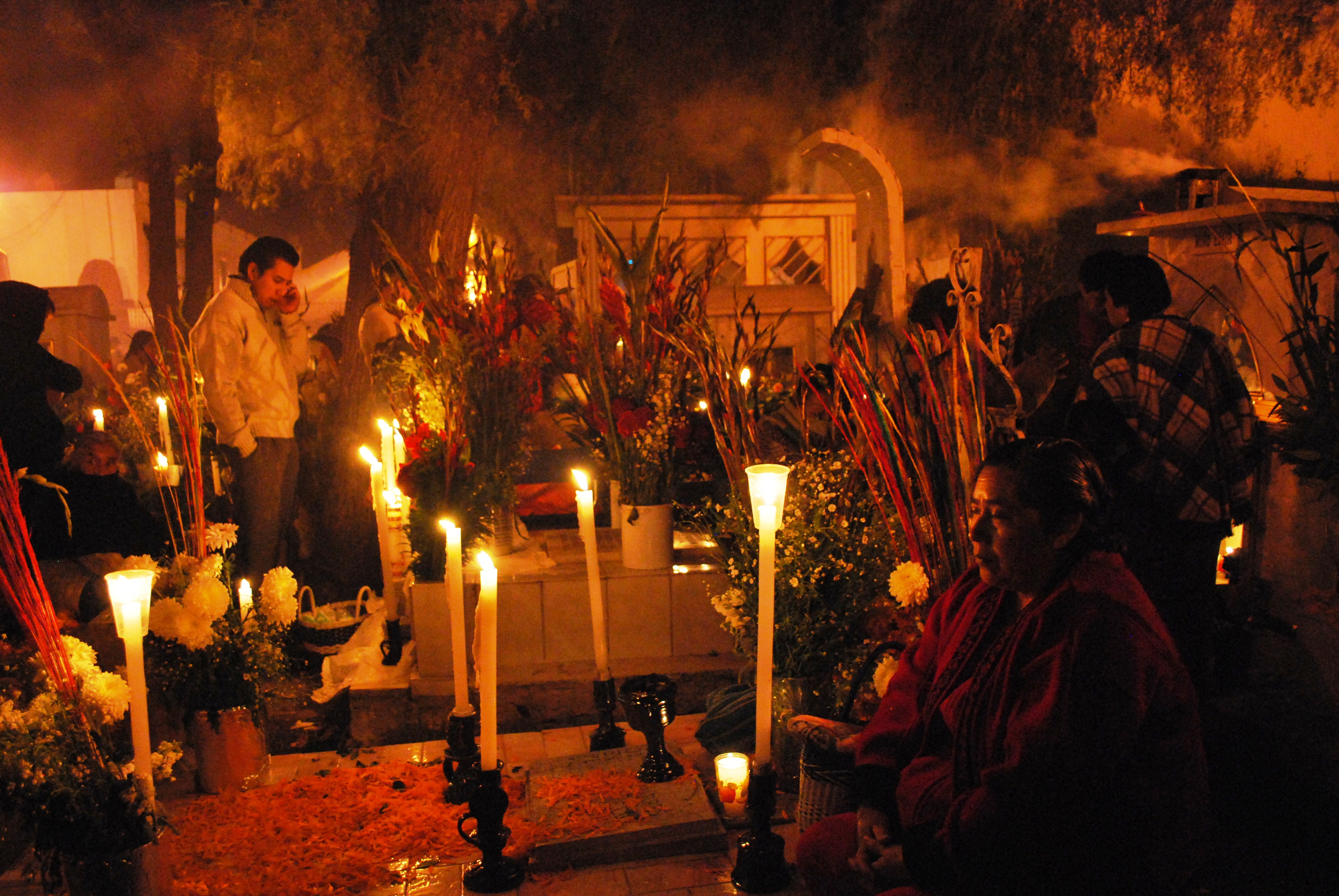
Woman by grave during the Alumbrada

On the morning of 2 November, grave cleaning and decoration begins in earnest. Graves in the main cemetery, which surrounds the Church of San Andres Apostal, are decorated with flowers, especially cempasúchil, candles and other items. The tombs are decorated carefully and sometimes elaborately, making images of the Virgin, cross or other icons with flowers, flower petals or colored sawdust. These graves are prepared for the Alumbrada, which begins at eight pm when the church bells ring yet again. By this time, the church has its own large ofrenda and its lights are dimmed. At this hour, the cemetery around the church is full of color from the flowers and glowing due to the light of thousands of burning candles and thick smoke from copal incense.

Due to the large number of visitors, in 2009, special security operations were put into place. A large number of officers on foot and horseback were on patrol and extra equipment for traffic control was provided. The sale of alcohol was restricted to certain zones and to certain hours.
