= Tláhuac =

Coordinates: 19°18′15″N 99°03′15″W

- Borough
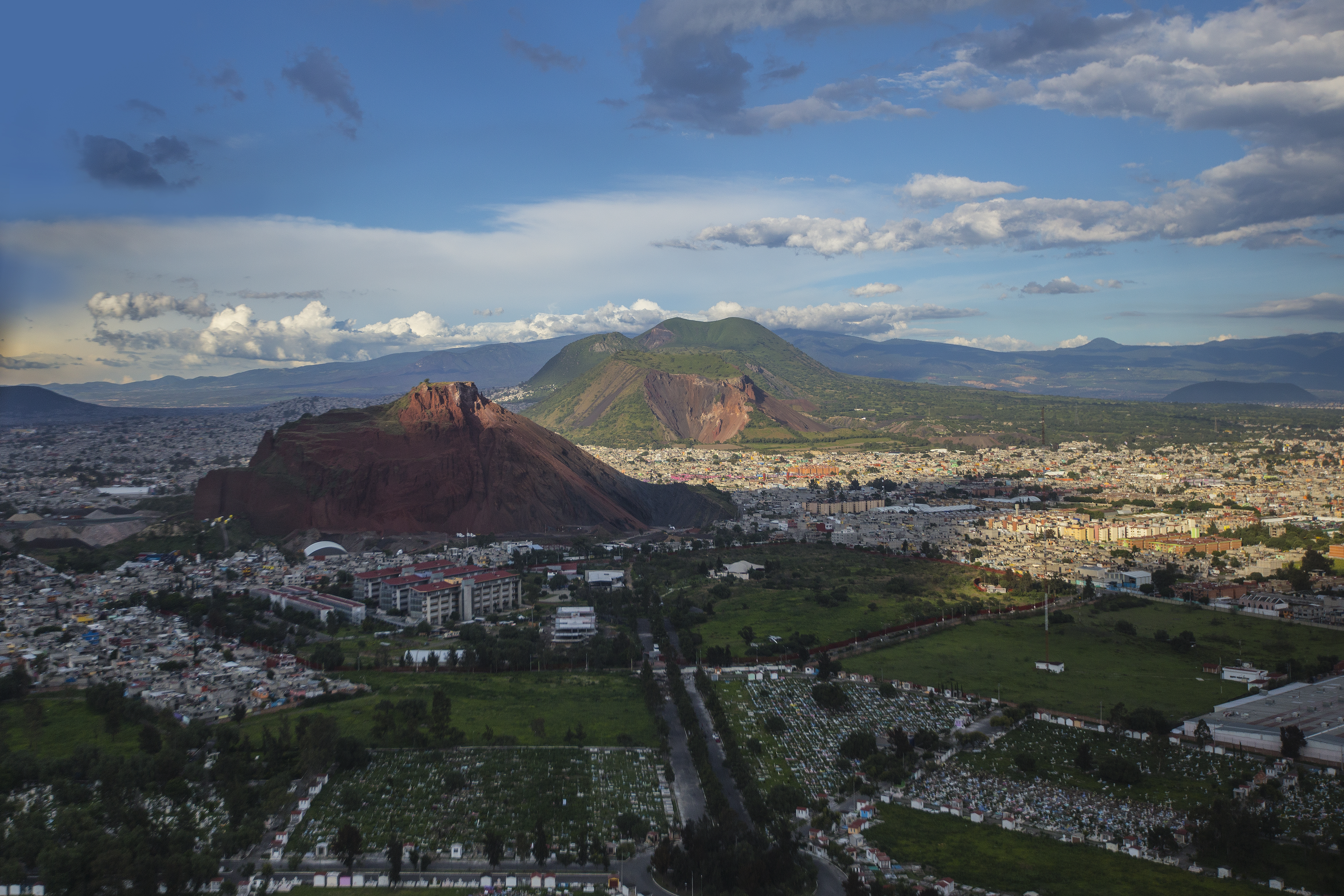
- Aerial view of Tláhuac

- Seal

- Location of Tláhuac within Mexico City
- Country: Mexico
- Federal entity: Mexico City
- Established: 1928
- Named for: Cuitláhuac
- Seat: Av. Tláhuac and Nicolás Bravo, Barrio La Asunción, Tláhuac

Government
  - Mayor: Berenice Hernández Calderón (MORENA)
  - Federal electoral district: CDMX-09

Area
  - Total: 83.45 km^{2} (32.22 sq mi)
- Elevation: 2,200 m (7,200 ft)

Population (2020)
  - Total: 392,313
  - Density: 4,701/km^{2} (12,180/sq mi)
- Time zone: UTC-6 (Zona Centro)
- Area code: 55
- Website: tlahuac.cdmx.gob.mx

Tláhuac is one of the sixteen boroughs (demarcación territorial) of Mexico City, located at the southeastern edge of the metropolitan area. Though Tláhuac still contains rural communities within its borders, mostly in the southern and eastern portions, the borough has undergone massive urbanization in the 20th century, especially in the northwest. Tláhuac has experienced the fastest rate of population growth in Mexico City since the 1960s.

Much of the borough's area is former lakebed where Lake Chalco and Lake Xochimilco met, with the town of San Pedro Tláhuac originally on an island. There are still some lake areas in the present day, along with four major canals and wetlands, also under conservation status. The urbanization has led to serious traffic and transportation problems. In 2012, Line 12 of the Mexico City Metro was completed with a terminal in the borough.

Tláhuac pronunciation

== Geography ==
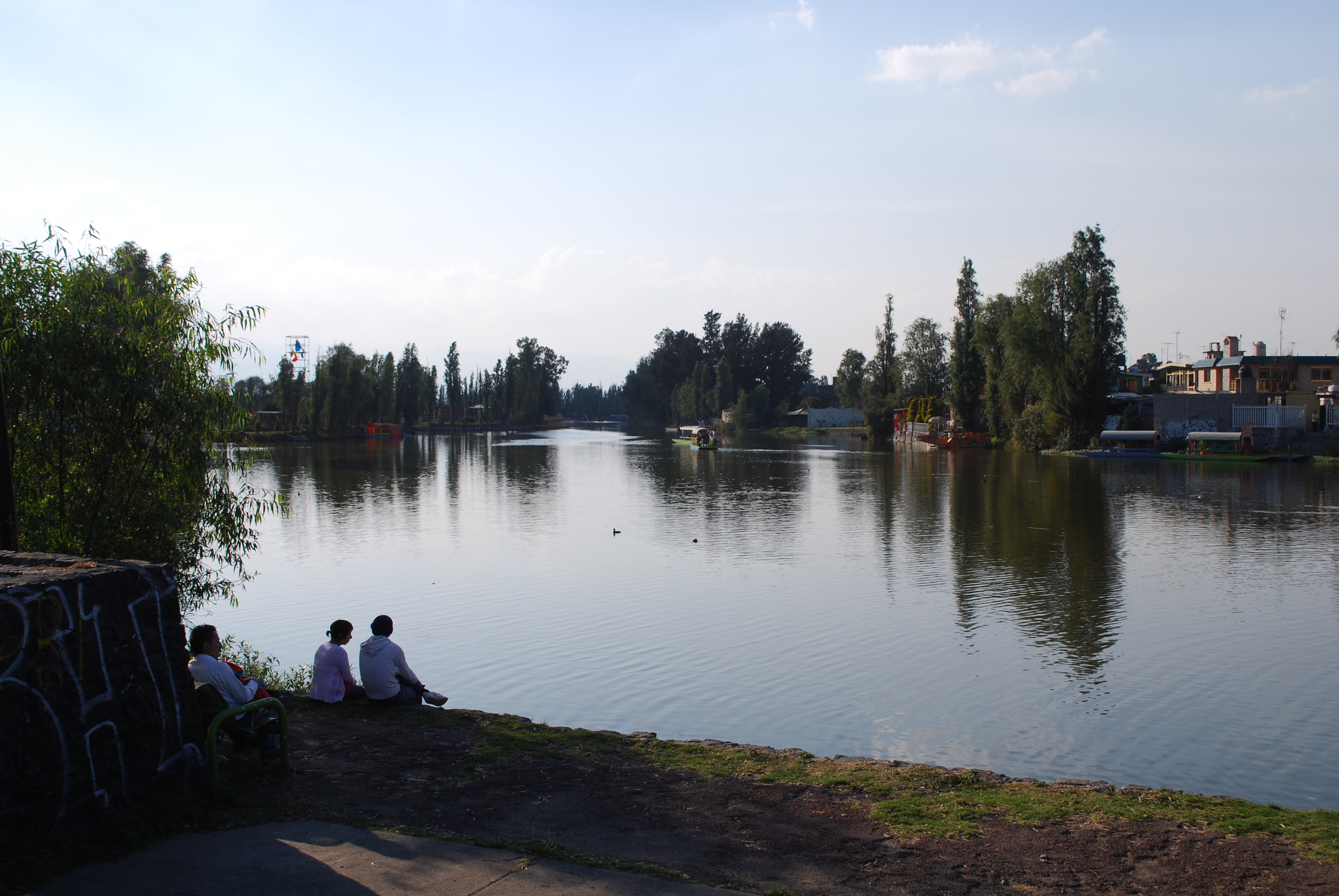
View of Lago de los Reyes Aztecas near San Juan Tláhuac

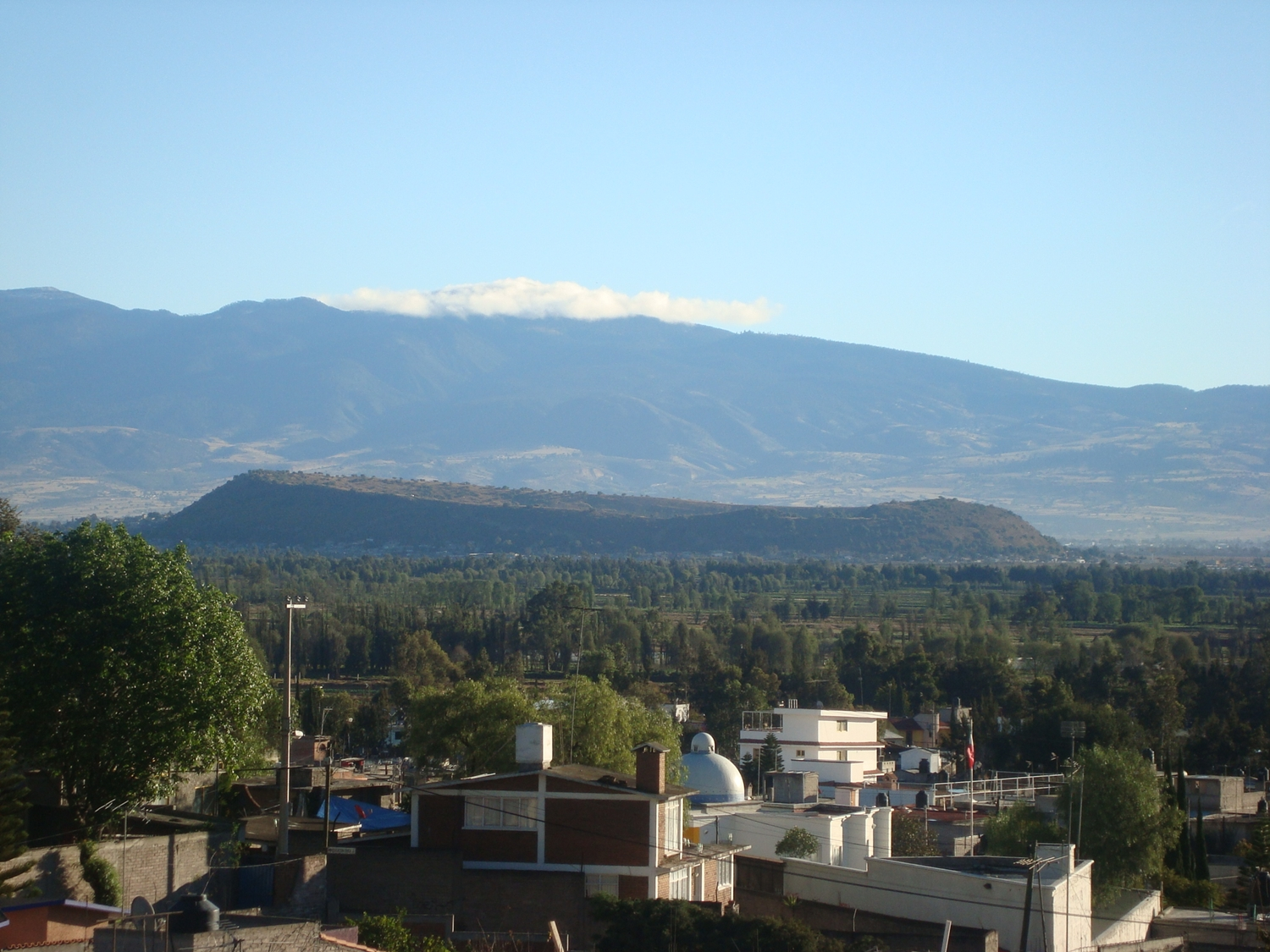
View of the Xico mountain in Tláhuac

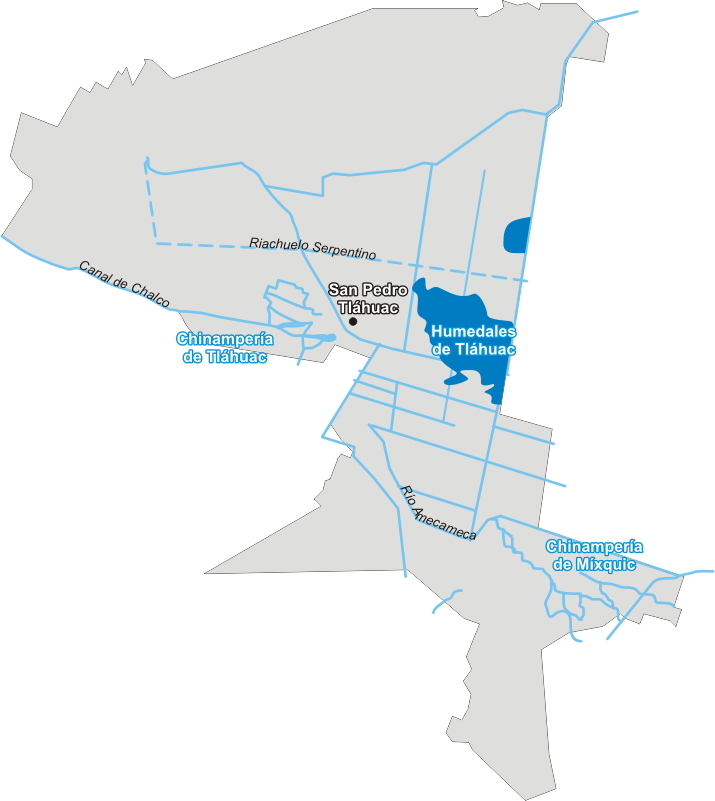
Hydrodraulic map of the borough

The borough of Tláhuac is located in the southeastern part of Mexico City, about 60 km from the historic center of Mexico City . It is bordered by the boroughs of Iztapalapa, Milpa Alta and Xochimilco, as well as by the municipality of Valle de Chalco Solidaridad in the State of Mexico. The borough extends over 89.5 square kilometres (34.6 sq mi) of territory, accounting for 5.75% of the area of the Federal District of Mexico City. The borough is on the eastern edge of the Valley of Mexico, in the Trans-Mexican Volcanic Belt that extends across central Mexico. The borough extends over much of the lakebeds of the former Lake Chalco and Lake Xochimilco where the two lakes were historically connected; the lakes were gradually drained over the centuries following the Spanish conquest. The territory of Tláhuac is classified into three zones: flat lakebed, transitional areas and hills with accumulated volcanic materials. The main points of elevation include the Guadalupe Volcano, the Xaltepec Volcano, Tecuautzi, Tetecón, the Sierra de Santa Catarina, and the Teuhtli Volcano. The Sierra de Santa Catarina is a small volcanic belt which has elevations of up to 2,800 meters above sea level. It serves as an important aquifer recharge area as well as a barrier to urban sprawl from Iztapalapa on the other side. On the south end is the Tehuitli Volcano with an altitude of 2,700 meters above sea level.

The borough contains a number of neighborhoods and localities. Those considered by the government to be urban (with 2010 population figures in parentheses) are: Tláhuac (305,076), San Juan Ixtayopan (24,120), San Andrés Mixquic (13,310), Santa Catarina Yecahuitzotl (9,563), and San Nicolás Tetelco (4,246). In addition, the borough includes approximately 50 rural settlements, each with populations of less than 1,000.

The predominant climate of the borough is semi-moist and temperate with an average annual temperature of 15.7 °C (60.3 °F), varying between a low of 8.3 °C (46.9 °F) and a high of 22.8 °C (73.0 °F). The average annual rainfall is 533.8 mm, with most rain falling from June to August.

Much of the area is former shallow lake with remaining open water, wetlands, and canals. Much of the surface water is saline due to the high mineral content of the soil and lack of natural outflow. The Lago de los Reyes Aztecas ("Lake of the Aztec Kings") covers 1.9 hectares and connects to the large network of canals and chinampas in the borough. It hosts about twenty-five species of migratory birds, including ducks and storks, along with various fish, amphibians, and reptiles. It is the most important tourist attraction in the borough and has many docks and trajinera boats. The main docks in Tláhuac do not have a large number of boats or restaurants as in Xochimilco. It is still possible to see small natural islands as well as natural vegetation in much of the area, with chinampas still growing foodstuffs such as broccoli, chard, beets, chili peppers, peas, fava beans, and corn. There are four main canals: Chalco, Guadalupano, Atecuyuac, and Amecameca. The first two are important as sources of water for the chinampas of the borough and as tourist attractions. There are also other smaller canals which serve as irrigation. On the border with the State of Mexico, there is an important ecological reserve lake area called the Cienega de Tláhuac. There is also an artificial lake at the Bosque de Tláhuac. Los Humedales wetlands, a remnant of Lake Chalco, is an ecological reserve which covers between 400 and 800 hectares depending on whether it is the rainy or dry season. It is one of the few wetlands left in the Valley of Mexico and hosts a large number of migratory birds. It is also home to species such as pocket gophers, skunks, squirrels, snakes, and bats.

Much of the Tláhuac borough is an important recharge zone for aquifers, especially the area around the Sierra de Santa Catarina. There are a number of flood-prone areas, especially during the rainy season, mostly due to poor drainage systems and the existence of urban areas on former lakebed. Despite being built on a significant amount of former lakebed the borough in general is not prone to earthquake damage, with only a few areas with susceptibility scattered throughout the borough. There is also a fault line south of Avenida Tláhuac.

Most of the wild vegetation of the area is that of grassland with very little forest, mostly due to a long history of agriculture in the area. One of the few forested areas is the Ayaquemetl mountain near San Nicolás Tetelco, covering about ten hectares. There have been some efforts at reforestation. However, most of the plant life in the area is agricultural, especially in the east and south where corn, spinach, other leafy greens, alfalfa, figs, pears, and walnuts are cultivated. There is also significant aquatic vegetation such as water lilies, chichicastle, and ninfa. Most of the wildlife of the area has been extinguished because of human encroachment, but in the Santa Catarina mountains there are still badgers, cacomistle, and bats as well as various kinds of rodents and birds found throughout the borough.

The main problems confronting the borough, like others in the south of Mexico City, are urban sprawl and environmental concerns. The area is under transition from rural to urban as it borders the urbanized Iztapalapa and the rural Milpa Alta. Its population is growing as people move away from the more crowded city center. 33.5% of the territory is urbanized and 66.5% is classified as environmentally protected. Most of the latter land area (4,030 out of 5,674 hectares) is farmed. Most of the rest of the land corresponds to surface water such as the Ciénega de Tláhuac and the foothills of the Teuhtli mountains west of San Juan Ixtayopan. Just under 75% of the urbanized space is residential, with 12.1% mixed-use, 5.8% parks and green spaces, 5.5% occupied by irregular settlements, and 1.7% dedicated to urban infrastructure. The areas undergoing the most urbanization are La Nopalera, Agrícola Metropolitana, Villa Centroamericana, Santiago Norte, and La Asunción, mostly due to the construction of apartment buildings. Sprawl comes into the borough mostly from Iztapalapa, through Avenida Tláhuac and the San Rafael Atlixco rail line. It also comes in from Coyoacan and Xochimilco through the Canal de Chalco and Anillo Periférico, as well as from Valle de Solidaridad Chalco in the State of Mexico. The best-preserved areas are those that border rural Milpa Alta. The main urban corridors are along Avenida Tláhuac, which is also where most of the commercial activity takes place. Other corridors include Avenida Estanislao Ramírez, Avenida La Turba, and Avenida Jiménez. Most of the mixed-use space is in the northwest of the borough and along Avenida Tláhuac. Urbanization is most prominent in the northwest of the borough, which has most of the area's apartment complexes. The rest of the borough has single-family homes and duplexes. Other areas with significant residential growth are Zapotitlán and San Francisco Tlaltenco which has led to a deterioration of their traditional rural appearance. This is especially true in locations closest to Avenida Tláhuac. Areas which have maintained more of their rural character are Santa Catarina Yechuizotl (sheltered by Sierra de Santa Catarina), as well as San Juan Ixtayopan, San Nicolás Tetelco and San Andrés Mixquic, which are mostly surrounded by chinampas and other farmland that is under protection.

Other green spaces in the borough include parks, sporting venues, and recreational areas. The Bosque de Tláhuac is a recreational area with a number of attractions, which was opened in 2007, converted from a former landfill. It extends over 72 hectares and features an artificial lake, a teaching farm/greenhouse, a cactus garden, volleyball and basketball courts, soccer fields, track, bicycle paths, and an area for cultural events. It also includes an area called the “Mini-Marquesa” with attractions such as ATV tracks similar to those found at the La Marquesa National Park, as well as the city's first artificial beach (pools plus sand area) designed for children. The Parque de los Olivos dates back to the colonial period when in 1531 olive trees were planted here by missionaries and were some of the few that escaped destruction by royal decree to protect Spanish olive production. It also contains a small hill where archaeological artifacts from as far back as 400 BCE have been found. Parque Xalli is located on the old road to San Francisco Tlaltenco. It was founded by Alejandro Reyes and Valentín Hernández with 3,000 square meters of installations related to ecology. It has a 60-meter-long zipline and a climbing wall. It has a large sand area for children, as well as a trampoline, pool, tree house, and mini-ziplines. There is also a petting zoo with various farm animals, most of which were donated to the park. Other green spaces include athletic and recreational centers in Santa Catarina, Colonia del Mar, Miguel Hidalgo, Zapotitlán, San Francisco Tlaltenco, San Pedro Tláhuac, San Juan Ixtayopan, San Nicolás Tetelco, and San Andrés Mixquic.

Pollution problems in the borough stem from urbanization of the area. Traffic congestion is a serious problem and parking space is severely limited. Much of the pollution in the borough comes from fixed sources along Avenida Tláhuac. Canal and lake waters have moderate problems with pollution in the way of garbage and the infestation of non-native water lily plants. The borough generates 356 tons of trash per day, 3.12% of the total produced in Mexico City. There are thirty areas where there is illegal house building, mostly near the Sierra de Santa Catarina and around San Juan Ixtayopan and La Conchita.

== Seven Native Towns ==
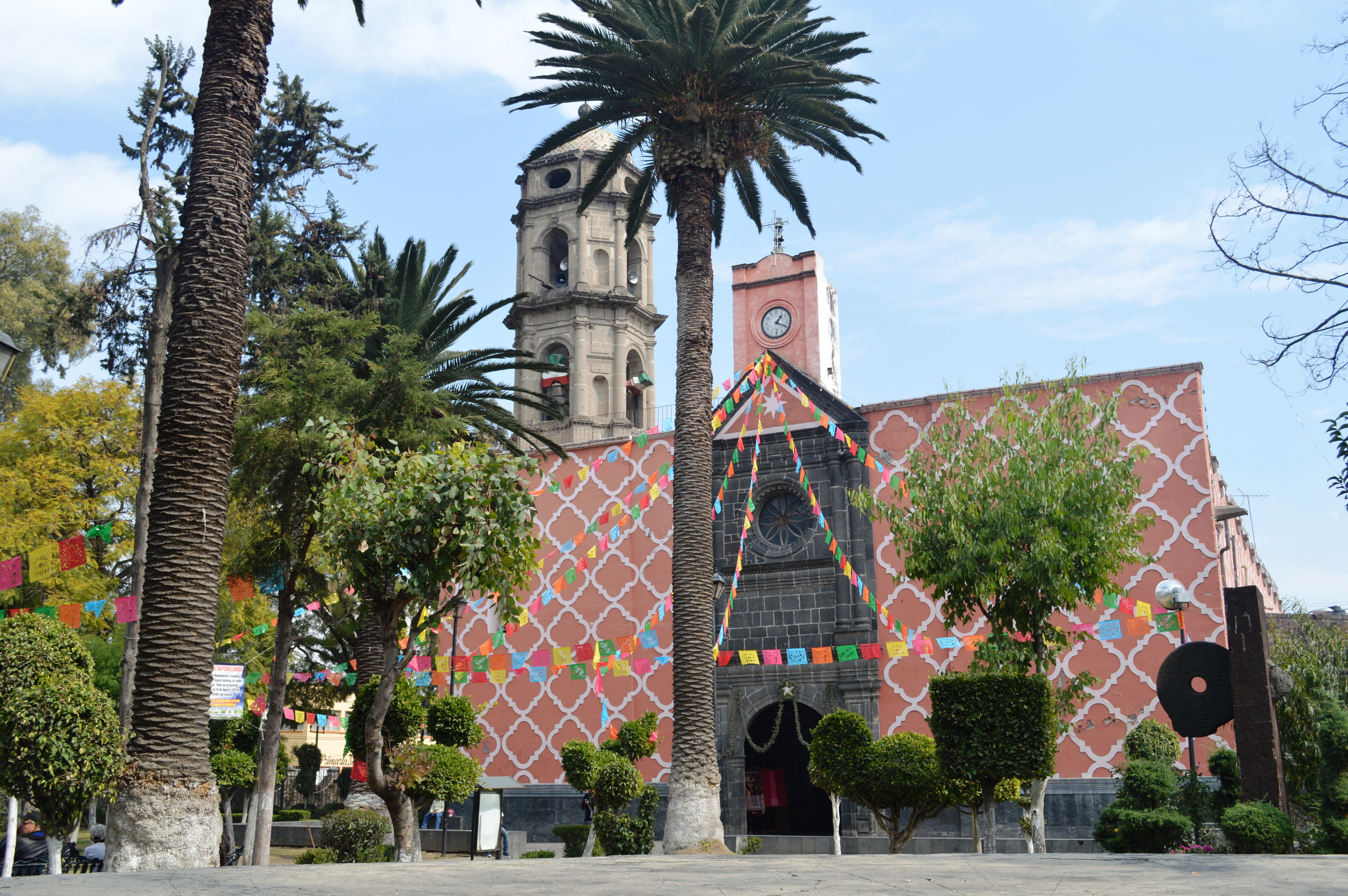
San Pedro Apóstol church in San Pedro Tláhuac

The most important communities in the borough are called the Seven Original/Native Towns of Tláhuac (Siete Pueblos Originarios de Tláhuac), meaning that they were established before the arrival of the Spanish. These are Santiago Zapotitlán, San Francisco Tlaltenco, Santa Catarina Yechuizotl, San Nicolas Tetelco, San Juan Ixtayopan, San Andrés Mixquic and San Pedro Tláhuac.

San Pedro Tláhuac is the oldest of these, founded in the 13th century. From that time until well into the colonial period, it was an island in the waters between Lake Chalco and Lake Xochimilco, and was the capital of a dominion that stretched of much of what is now the borough of Tláhuac. After the Spanish conquest, the ceremonial center was destroyed on top was built a church and monastery dedicated to Saint Peter, dated to 1529. At the time, it was one of the most important churches in the southern Valley of Mexico. It was rebuilt several times due to moisture damage with the current structure dating to the 17th century. The San Pedro church as three naves with images of Saint Peter, Saint Joachim and the Holy Trinity inside. In the tower there is a clock dating to 1924, which was donated by the Ejido of Tláhuac. Around the town, there is an areas with chinampas and a small residual lake called the Lago de los Reyes Aztecas, which also hosts the “Museo Vivo” (Live Museum) about the canals and farming of the area. Its main festivity is the Regional Fair of Tláhuac, held at the end of June along with honors to the town's patron saint.

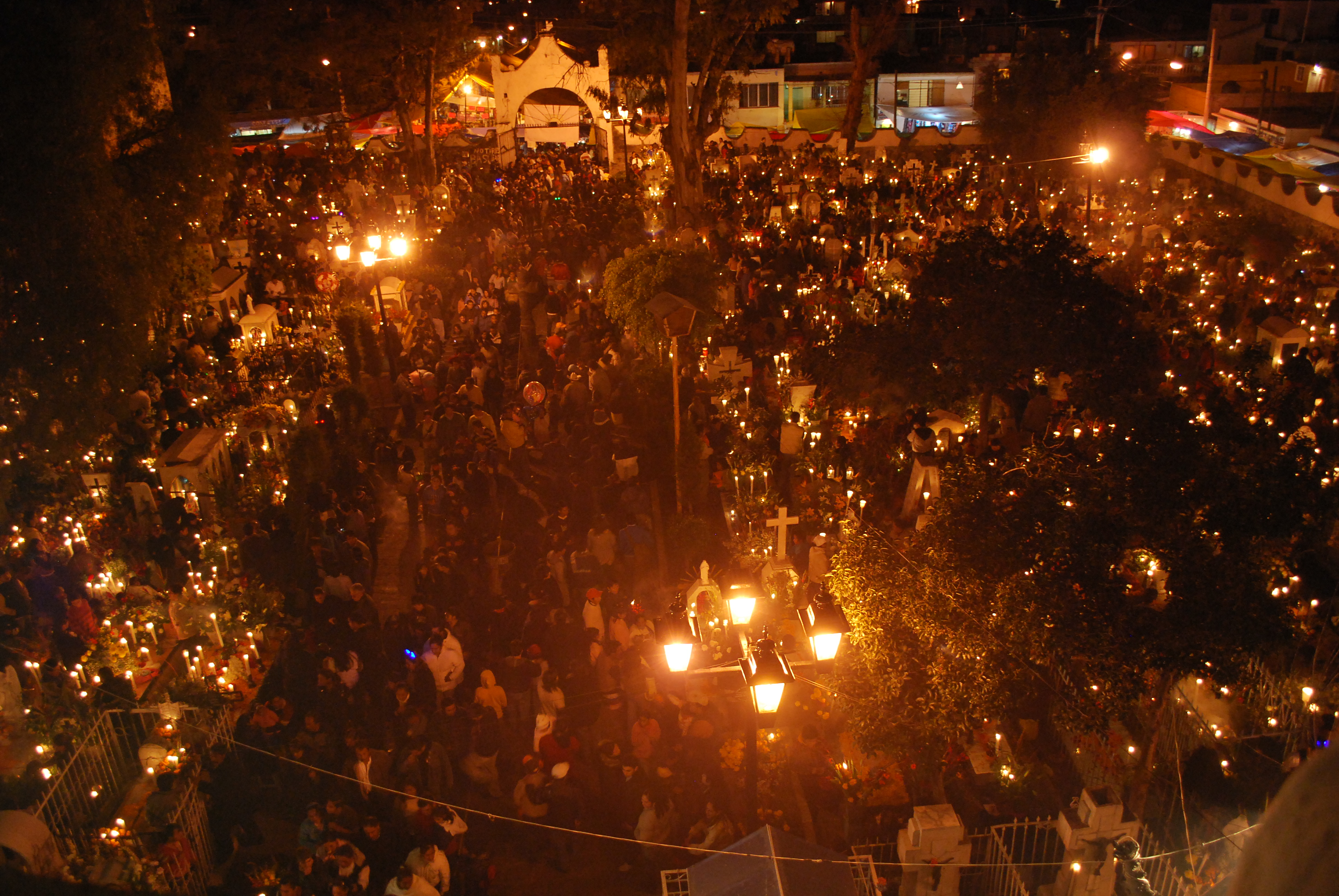
View of the "alumbrada" event for Day of the Dead at San Andrés Mixquic

San Andrés Mixquic in the Mesoamerican period was also a dominion located on a small lake island. Its main landmark is its parish church, founded in 1537. This church was built on top of a sanctuary for the goddess of life and death with archeological excavations finding many artifacts including a Chac Mool and two rings for a Mesoamerican ball court. The original building was mostly destroyed in an earthquake and then rebuilt in 1600. The only remains from the first church is the bell tower, which is separate from the church building. In each of the town's named neighborhoods, there is a stone cross, which is the center of celebrations on May 3. The patron saint is honored on November 30, with processions. San Andrés Mixquis is known for its Day of the Dead celebrations which attract many visitors each year.

San Francisco Tlaltenco is one of the largest communities in the borough, located in the north of the borough on the south side of the Sierra de Santa Catarina. It main church is the San Francisco de Asís founded in 1547. Another important landmark is the Gate or Arch of Tlaltenco, which dates to the colonial period. It served as a customs checkpoint until just after the Mexican War of Independence. It is considered to be symbolic of the area. During the Mexican Revolution, it was occupied by the Zapatistas and those loyal to Venustiano Carranza as a campsite. Its patron saint, Francis of Assisi, is honored for eight days starting on October 4 with processions and sawdust carpets. Another major celebration is Carnival which is celebrated with Chinelos. On the fifth Sunday after Ash Wednesday, a Christ figure called the Señor de Mazatepec is honored.

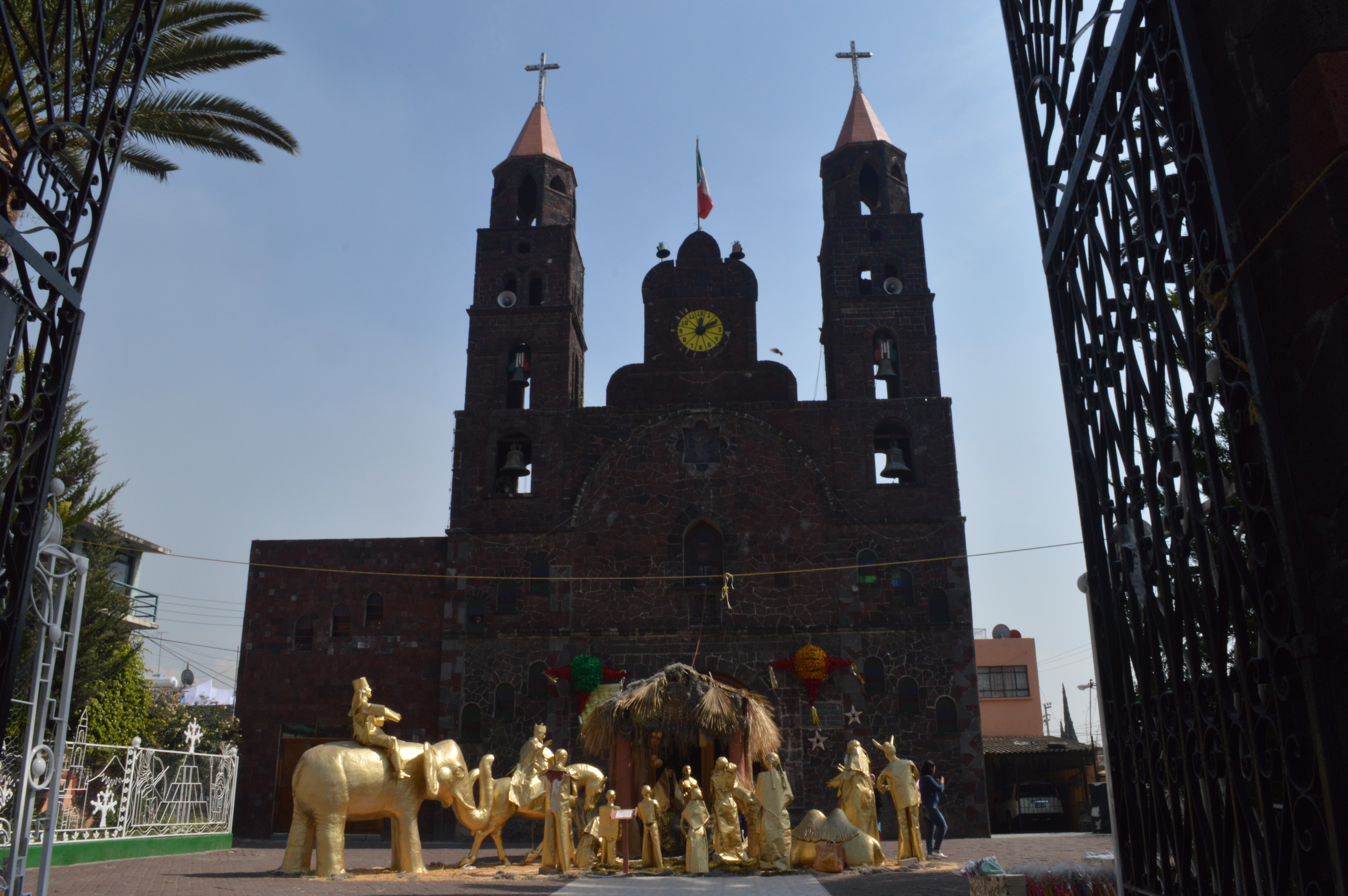
View of the parish church in Santiago Zapotitlán

Santiago Zapotitlán was founded in 1435. After the Aztecs conquered the area, they rearranged the layout of this town. After the Spanish conquest, the Inmaculada Concepción church was established in 1541 and rebuilt in 1939. Its founding is celebrated on December 8 of each year. Santiago Zapotitlán is noted for its religious and cultural traditions with both pre Hispanic and Spanish roots. One of its main celebrations is the La Fiesta de Luces y Música (Festival of Lights and Music) which is based on the New Fire ceremony. Today it is celebrated with traditional dances and fireworks along with music played on both indigenous and European instruments.

San Juan Ixtayopan is in the south of the borough made up of five named neighborhoods called San Augustin, La Concepción, La Soledad, La Asunción and La Lupita. Just outside there are six others called Francisco Villa, El Rosario, Tierra Blanca, Peña Alta and Jardines del Llano. Its main church is La Soledad constructed in the 19th century. Although it has been severely affected urban sprawl, there is still some chinampa farming surrounding it. The town was the site of the Battles of Ixtayopan during the Mexican Revolution. Zapatistas under Everardo González took over the area from federal troops with the support of the local people. Later these forces battled those loyal to Venustiano Carranza in the power struggles that ensued among the rebel factions. San Juan Ixtayopan has a site museum located in Los Olivos Park which houses a number of archeological finds with 188 exhibited. The main plaza is the Plaza de la Soledad, built in the 17th century. The main festivals are for Our Lady of Solitude from 2–5 January and for John the Baptist from 22 – 24 June. The town is noted for a hot beverage called calientito” (little hot one) which is a mix of sugar cane alcohol, orange juice, guava, raisins and sugar cane. In August, San Juan Ixtayopan hosts an annual Corn Fair to promote products made with the grain as well as the local culture.

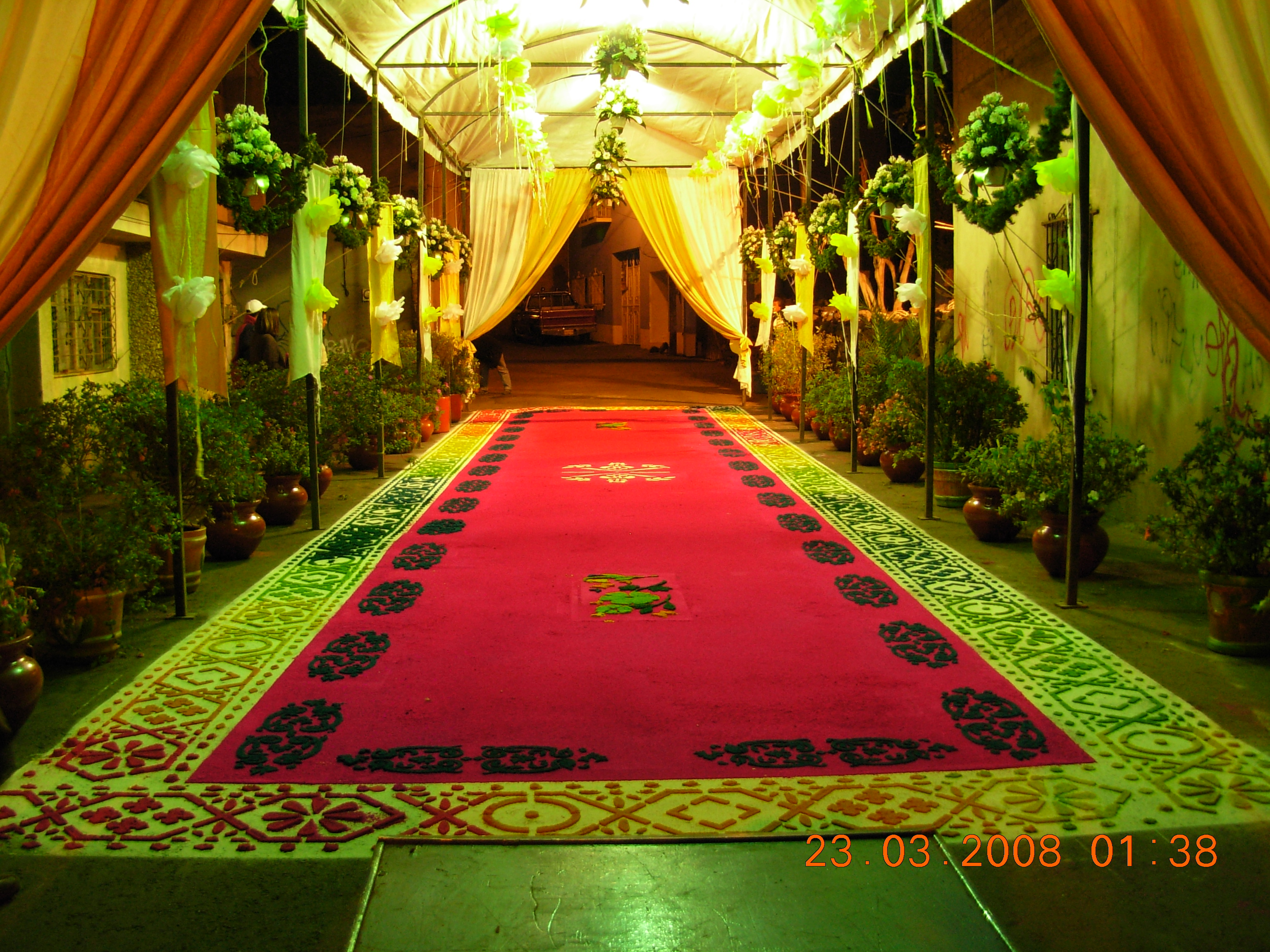
Sawdust carpet created in San Juan Ixtayopan

San Nicolás Tetelco is centered on its parish church dedicated to Nicholas of Tolentino, constructed in the 17th century. In the presbytery, there is a large crucifix which is probably made from corn stalk in the colonial era as well as a holy water font from the 16th century. Other landmarks include the Plaza Emiliano Zapata, which is surrounded by older constructions, the Monument to Christ the King, the Ahuapa sports facility, the Ayaquemetl ecological area and the chinampa zones. It is also home to the former hacienda Santa Fe, which was founded in the 17th century which operated until the Mexican Revolution. Remains of its chapel, main house and workers’ living quarters still remain. The town is noted for its atole, cooked traditionally over a wood fire.

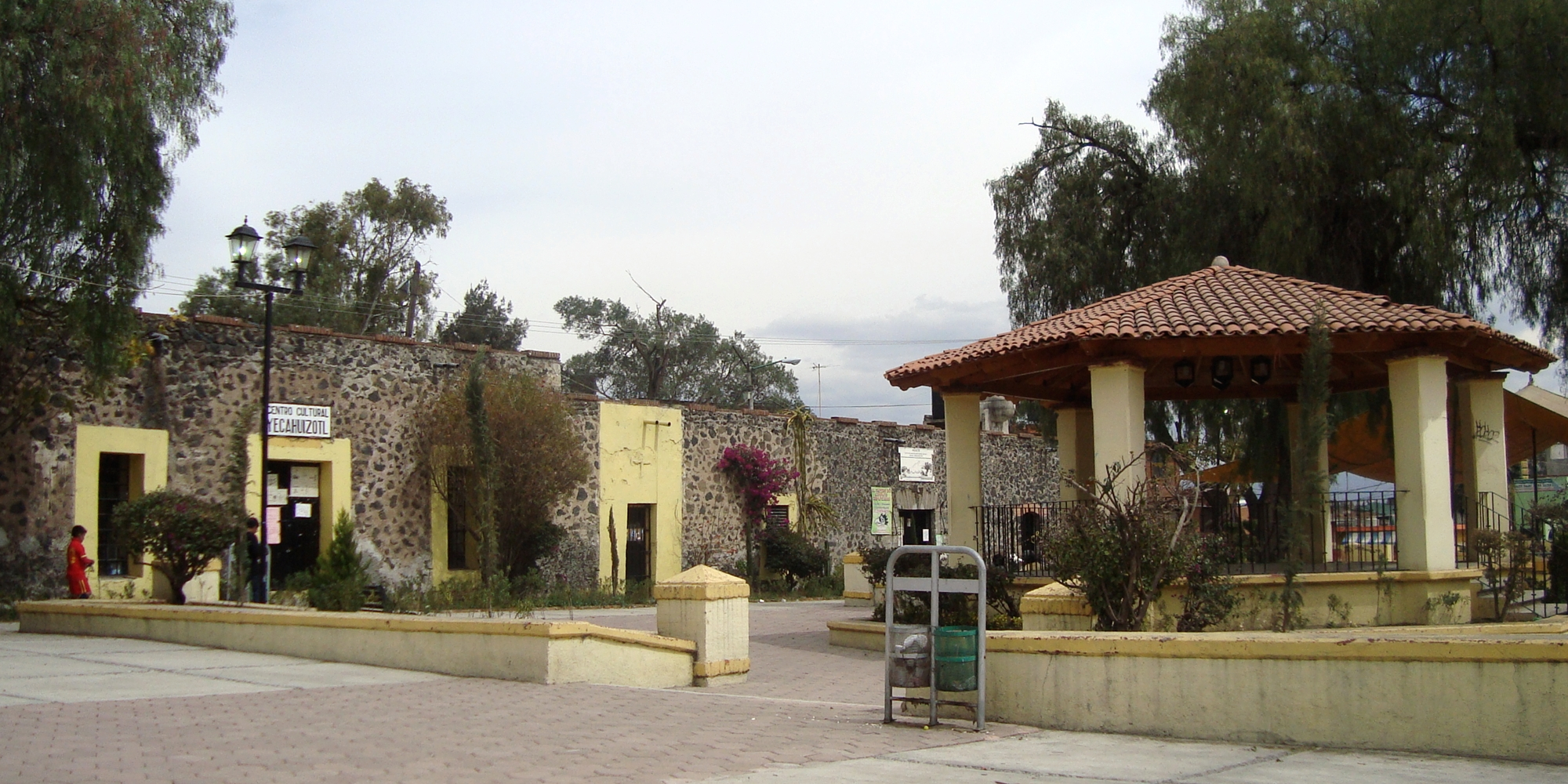
Plaza in Santa Catarina Yecahuitzotl

Santa Catarina Yecahuitzotl is located in the northeast of the borough. Its church, dedicated to Saint Catherine, dates to 1647, constructed of tezontle. The atrium has four small chapels located in the four corners. Until the 1960s, the community was isolated from Mexico City. However at that time urban sprawl began to reach it changing much of the community's way of life. Its original name was Acatzinco, then Santa Catarina Cuautli-Itlacuayan. Its current name has been interpreted to mean “the third part of the south road,” the “nose of an amphibian” and “land of ants.” The name change came with the town's refounding in 1924 when ejido members organized their lands among themselves. Other important locations include La Troje, site of Mexican Revolution activity, the charrería ring, the former Xico hacienda and two environmental education centers. It is divided into a number of neighborhoods called colonias such as Maria Isabel, Santiago, Del Carmen, San Juan Tlalpizahuac, Ampliación San Juan TlalpizahuacSan Francisco Apolocalco, La Cañada, Campestre Potrero, San Francisco Tlaltenco, Selene and Ampliacion Selene.

== History ==
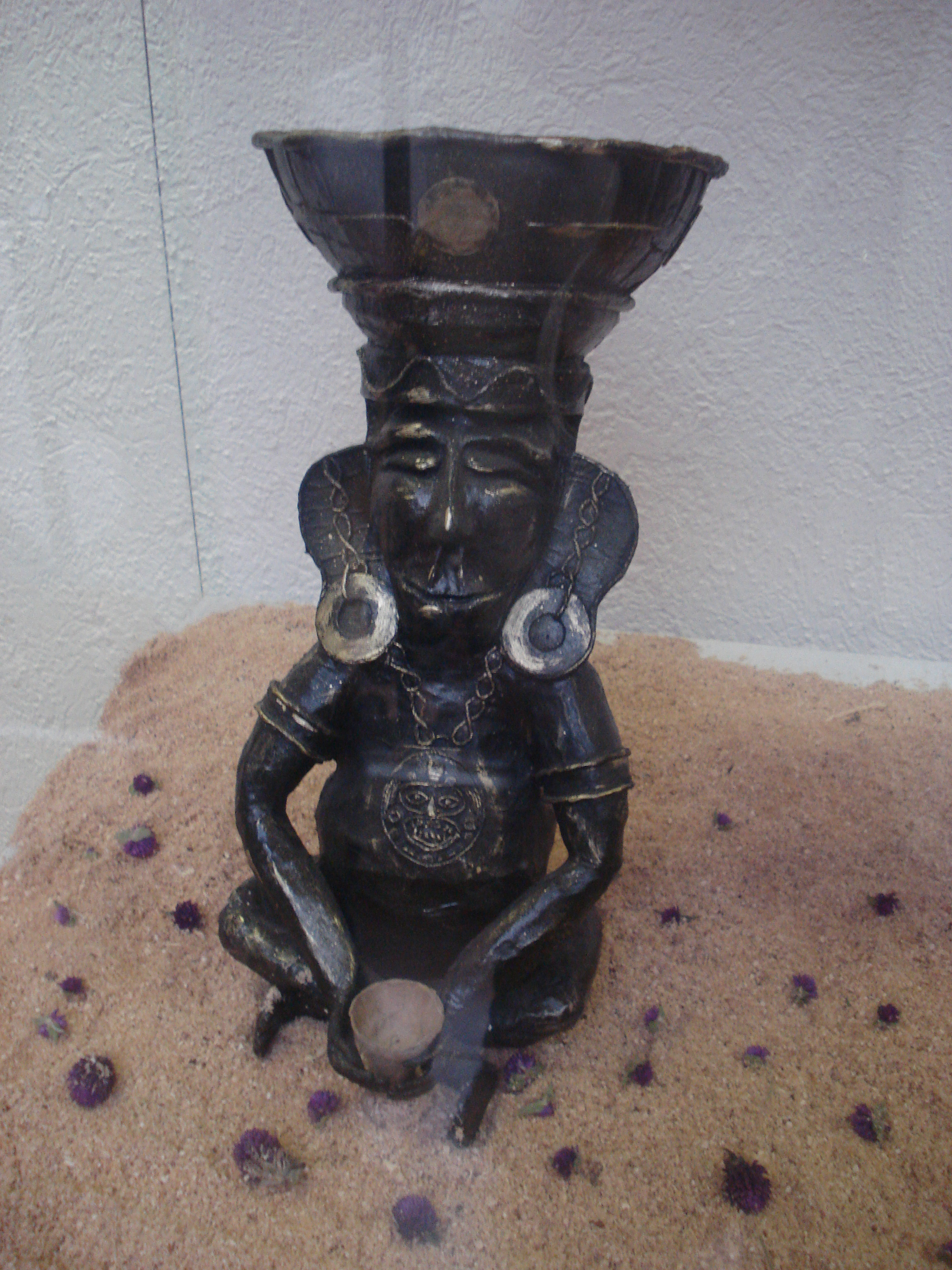
Brazier from the San Andrés Mixquic area

The name “Tláhuac” comes from Nahuatl, mostly likely a derivation of “Cuitláhuac”. However, its meaning is in dispute, with interpretations including “the place where cuítatl (a type of algae) is gathered”, “place where the Lord sings”, “guardian or steward of the land", “born among the rocks of the lakes” and “place of he who cares for the water”.

Tláhuac, also referred to in historical records as Cuitláhuac, was an altepetl on a small island in the waters between Lake Chalco and Lake Xochimilco established in 1222 by the Chichimecas. The rulers were titled tzompanteteuctin nahualteteuctin (sorcerer chiefs) and were said to descend from Mixcoatl. The city was divided into four parts (Tiçic, Tepancalcan, Atenchicalcan, and Tecpan). The main gods worshipped in Tláhuac were Mixcoatl, Itzpapalotl, Amimitl and Atlahua. By the 14th century, it had become a dominion expanding as far as what is now Santiago Zapotitlán and Santa Catarina Yecahuizotl, but distinct from the dominion of Mixquic, which was on a nearby island. Tláhuac was connected to the mainland by two causeways leading to Santiago Zapotitlán and Tulyehualco. The first regional leader of the area was Cohuatomatzin in 1262. The dominion remained independent until the 14th century, when it was conquered by the Tepanecs and forced to pay tribute to Azcapotzalco. In 1429, it was conquered by the Aztecs and from that point on paid tribute to Tenochtitlan. During the pre-Hispanic period, the economy of the area was based on chinampa farming and fishing. The town of Tláhuac was laid out along the various dikes and canals which centered on a ceremonial center, where the San Pedro parish church is today.

The area was prone to flooding but it was prosperous due to intensive chinampa farming, growing corn, beans, chili peppers, tomatoes, squash, flowers and more. Much of this produce was sent to Tenochtitlan as tribute. There was a major flood in 1499, prompting the construction of a large dike against the lake waters. Another dike was constructed to separate the lakes.

After the Spanish conquest of the Aztec Empire, colonial authorities defined Tláhuac as extending to Zapotitlán, Cuauhtlitl-Tlacuayan (Santa Catarina) and Tulyehualco. In the colonial period, the Spanish authorities initially emphasized Mixquic as a political center because it has only one indigenous chief, while Tláhuac was divided under four. Three orders began evangelical work, the Augustinians in Mixquic and the Franciscans, replaced by the Dominicans in Tláhuac. By the 18th century, Tláhuac had come under the administration of Chalco. The area's economy remain tied to agriculture, still sending much of the production to Mexico City, now to be sold. Flood control projects continued, with drainage of lake area begun in 1555. During the colonial period and into the 19th century, transportation by small boats was primary on the area's lakes and canals. Boats transported not only people but cargo, especially agricultural produce bound for Mexico City. Customs gates were installed on the main canals in Tlatenco and Tulyehualco to collect taxes on various vegetables, cereals and alcohol from the state of Morelos. Important colonial era haciendas included San Nicolas Tolentino, Santa Fe Tetelco and Zoquiapan.

After the Mexican War of Independence, Tláhuac became part of the State of Mexico. When the Federal District of Mexico City was expanded in 1854, Tláhuac became part of the District, then part of the prefecture of Xochimilco in 1857. Agriculture remained the main economic activity. In the late 19th century, the Santa Fe hacienda was known for its cattle and the size of the vegetables grown there. In 1856, the Mexico City-Tlahuac causeway flooded completely. In 1895, a project was started to drain Lake Chalco. Soon after, the Chalco-Tlaltenco road was constructed over the former lake bed, followed by a rail line that passed through half of the current territory of the borough. In the latter 19th century, steamships traveling between Mexico City and Chalco passed by.

In the 19th century, the town of Tláhuac had municipality status which was eliminated in 1903 with a reorganization of the Federal District. The Mexican Revolution soon followed with one major battle at San Juan Ixtayopan between forces loyal to Emiliano Zapata and Venustiano Carranza. After the end of the military conflict, residents petitioned for autonomy, leading to the segregation of Tláhuac from Xochimilco in 1924 as a municipality. In 1928, this revived municipality was reorganized again into the current borough. The borders of the borough were not finalized until 1994, over opposition from Ejido members in some communities along the border with the State of Mexico.

The urban sprawl of Mexico City began to take over the Ejido lands in the mid-20th century, with former farmlands converted into housing subdivisions, especially in the areas closest to Iztapalapa.

In November 2004, three policemen were surrounded by an angry mob and lynched in San Juan Ixtayopan. They were accused of being kidnappers after taking pictures of children. Two of the policemen were burned alive while one rescued hours after the incident began.

== Culture ==
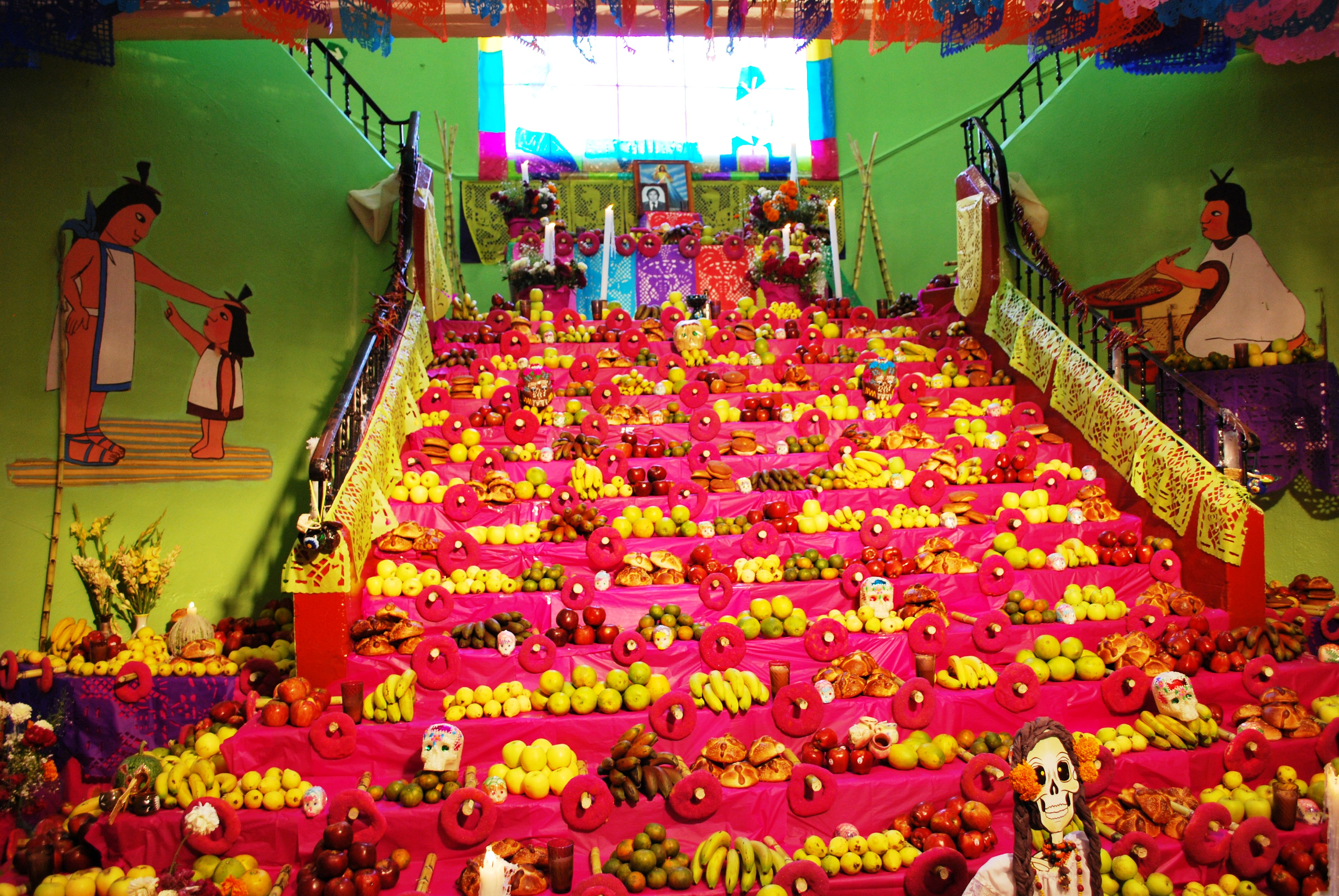
Large altar/offering to the dead at a primary school in San Andrés Mixquic

The area considers itself traditional conserving many colonial and Mesoamerican era traditions. Culturally the most important communities are the seven which have pre Hispanic roots which were located on the banks of Lakes Chalco and Xochimilco. Today these communities area marked by the oldest churches in the borough. Other important heritage sites as demarcated by INAH and the borough include the chinampas, located in various parts of the borough and Parque de los Olivos.

One important tradition is Day of the Dead, celebrated throughout the borough but San Andrés Mixquic's is particularly well known, attracting thousands of visitors from Mexico and abroad. The celebration generally lasts three days from October 31 to November 1 each day focusing on different groups, children, adults and saints. One local tradition related to the day is to hang a paper lantern often in the form of a star at the entrance to home as a way to greet the return of the souls of the dead. The Fiestas del Santo Jubileo is a custom observed on different days in the communities of the borough. It consists of a mass and exhibition of the Host on the main altar of the church for 40 hours, surrounded by flowers, sawdust carpets, live music, dances and fireworks. Carnival is important in San Francisco Tlaltenco and Santiago Zapotitlán, where dancers generally are chinelos and those in charro suits. These carnivals begin on the fourth Sunday of Lent. The tradition in San Francisco Tlaltenco goes back to the end of the 19th century. A reenactment of Palm Sunday has been held each year at San Pedro Tláhuac for over eighty years, with the procession winding its way through eight different neighborhoods. San Pedro Tláhuac is also the site of the Regional Fair of Tláhuac. It was first organized in 1956, with the goal so attracting tourism and encouraging youth to maintain traditions. It begins with a procession of the image of the patron saint, the Apostle Peter, in decorated trajinera boats in the chinampa areas of Lago de los Reyes Aztecas. Other events include the selection of a fair queen, conferences, cultural events, concerts, dances, fireworks and more, with proceeds going to the restoration of the San Pedro Apostal Church. The Baile del Guajolote (Dance of the Turkey) is a traditional dance in the towns of Santiago Zapotitlán and San Pedro Tláhuac, which is performed at weddings, baptism, first communions and quinceañeras. It includes the gifting of a live turkey along with a large food basket from one family to another. Another important traditional dance, especially in Santiago Zapotitlan is the Dance of Moors and Christians also called the Danza de los Santiagueros (Dance of those of Saint James). The dance represents the battles between the Moors and Christians in which Saint James plays a central role.

Typical foods are mostly similar to those found in the rest of Mexico City. One local dish is michmole, made from fish and sauce with herbs such as epazote .

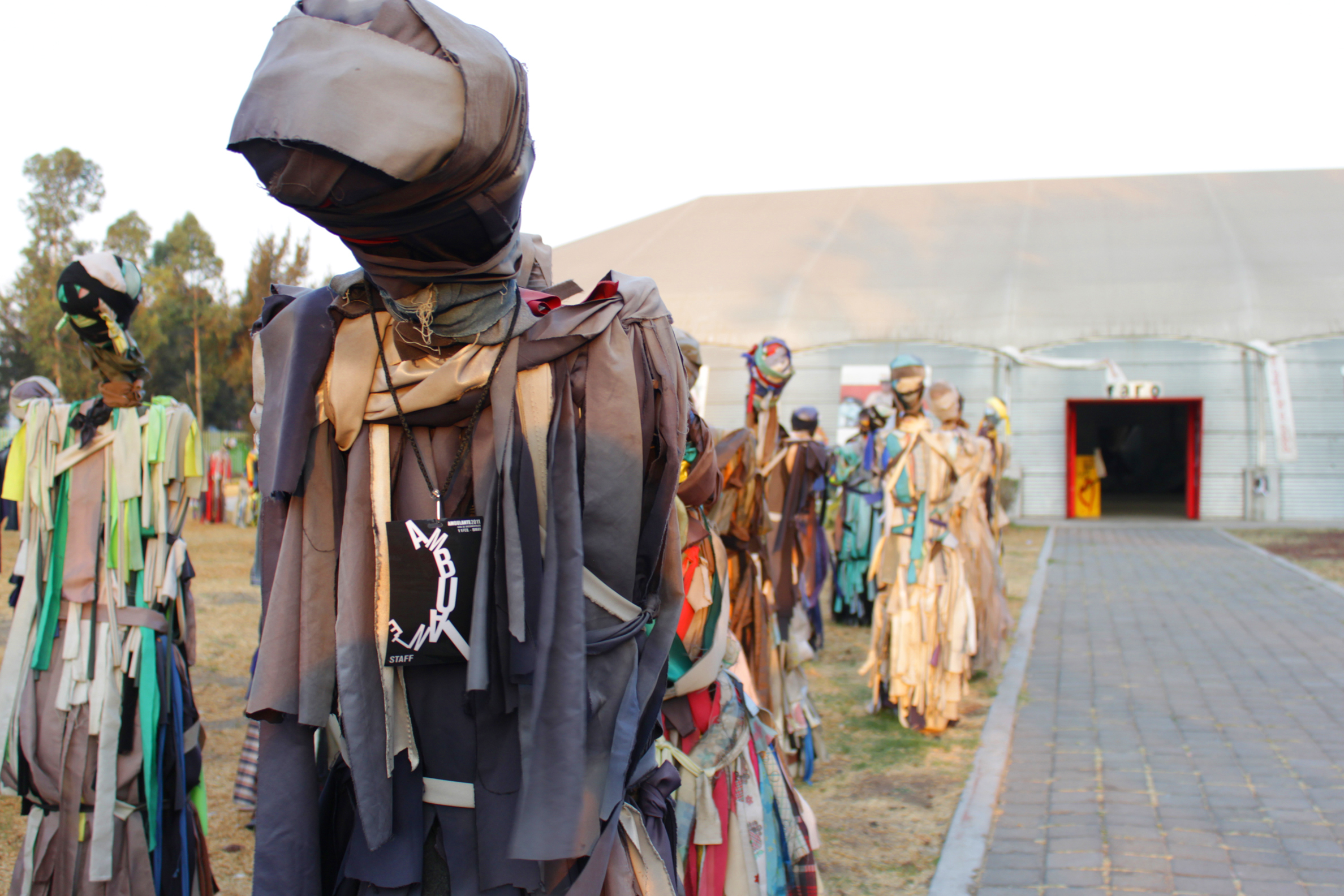
Exhibition outside FARO-Tláhuac

Overall, there is a significant lack of cultural institutions such as theaters, auditoriums and museums. However a number of institutions do exist. The Tlahuac Regional Museum is located in San Pedro Tláhuac. It is housed in the former civil registry office and was the first museum established in the borough. The Regional Museum of Mixquic is on the side of the parish church. It contains exhibitions of local archeological pieces which mostly date between 1200 and 1500CE but also some from the Toltec and Teotihuacan periods. The church and former monastery are also classed as an archeological site. The Andrés Quintana Roo Museum has a collection of 279 archeological pieces from the collectionof Dr. Socorro Bernal Roque. The pieces are mostly of clay and stone from the Teotihuacan era found in the Tlahuac area. The most important pieces are a chac-mool, the remains of a teotlachtli, clay and stone seals, a tzompantli and a cylindrical serpent. The Tomás Medina Villarruel Museum is named after a native of San Juan Ixtayopan who is an important figure in the conservation of the archeological record of the area. In 1984, he and his family donated a collection of 850 pieces to the borough. The museum was built in 1998 as a community museum and the collection has since grown with new donations. The Fábrica de Artes y Oficios FARO Tláhuac was founded in 2006, as part of a network of FAROs sponsored by the city Secretary of Culture. Its aim is to promote community involvement in the arts and various trades. It has workshops on various to allow residents to learn creative and practical skills as well as conferences, cinema, theater, art exhibitions, concerts and more. Other cultural institutions in the borough include the Centro Cultural Zapotitlán, Centro Cultural Santa Catarina, Centro Cultural Nopalera, Casa de Cultura Diego Rivera, Casa de Cultura Frida Kahlo, Casa de Cultura Ampliación Los Olivos and the Casa de Cultura Rosario Castellanos.

== Socioeconomics ==
Maps depicting urbanized areas in the borough

From the second half of the 20th century, the population and number of housing units has risen rapidly. The population has grown from 29,880 inhabitants in 1960, to 146,293 in 1980, to 255,891 in 1995, to 361,014 in 2010, to 392,313 as of the 2020 census. In the 1960s and 1970s, the rate of growth was over 7%. It has since slowed to under 4.5%, but it is still the highest in the Federal District. The main draw is the relatively low cost of land in comparison to the rest of the city. Tláhuac has a population density of 90 inhabitants per hectare, one of the lowest in the Federal District, which has an average of 128 per hectare. However, in some areas, density has climbed to over 200 per hectare mostly in the northwest. However, most of the borough still has fewer than 100 per hectare. Neighborhoods with the densest population include La Nopalera, Colonial Miguel Hidalgo and Colonial Los Olivos where most of the borough's apartment complexes can be found. Just under eighty percent of housing units are owned by their occupants, but still about ninety percent of housing units are single family homes.

Between 60,000 and 70,000 families inhabit 93 irregular settlements in Tlahuac. While some of the irregular settlements are in conservation areas, most are in areas in which the topography does not allow for the provision of urban services such as water. Although basic services extend to over 80-90 percent of the population, communities in the periphery and those which are new and not yet consolidated tend to suffer a lack of basic services along with transportation and roads.

Just under seventy percent of the population is under age thirty but this percentage has been slowing shrinking as the borough ages.

The Consejo Nacional de Población ranks Tláhuac as having a very low level of socioeconomic marginalization. About seventy percent of the population is employed in commerce and services. Twenty eight percent is involved in manufacturing and about 3.5% work in agriculture, the highest percentage in the Federal District. Over ninety percent of the commerce in the delegation occurs in small businesses, mostly along Avenida Tláhuac, Avenida La Turba and in the centers of the towns. Informal commerce, especially tianguis markets, is found in Zapotitlpan, San Pedro Tláhuac, near the San Lorenzo Tezonco cemetery and some along Avenida Tláhuac. There are 712 manufacturing concerns generally small concerns located in the northwest of the borough, producing food products, drinks, tobacco products, metal products, machinery and equipment. The service sector is mostly related to repair and maintenance. Most agriculture is found in the south and east with just over 4,000 hectares are under cultivation in the borough growing corn, animal feed, spinach, alfalfa and figs. Most of the livestock raised is pigs, followed by cattle than sheep.

The borough has two groups of police and five monitoring stations. However, the urbanization of the area has brought in increased crime including gang activity.

== Education ==
The borough has sixty seven preschools, seventy nine primary schools, twenty three middle schools and four high schools. There are sufficient primary and middle schools but a lack of educational services above this level. There are public libraries in Santiago Zapotitlán, San Pedro Tláhuac, Colonial del Mar, Miguel Hidalgo and Tetelco. The Universidad Insurgentes has several installations in the borough. The borough has a 5.61% illiteracy rate which compares favorably to the rest of Mexico City, but drop out rates are a concern. Most students drop out at the high school level or above, completing primary and middle school. But even at the primary level the dropout rate is 22.8%. The primary reason is the financial situation of the family.

Public high schools of the Instituto de Educación Media Superior del Distrito Federal (IEMS) include:

- Escuela Preparatoria Tláhuac "José Ma. Morelos y Pavón"

== Transportation ==
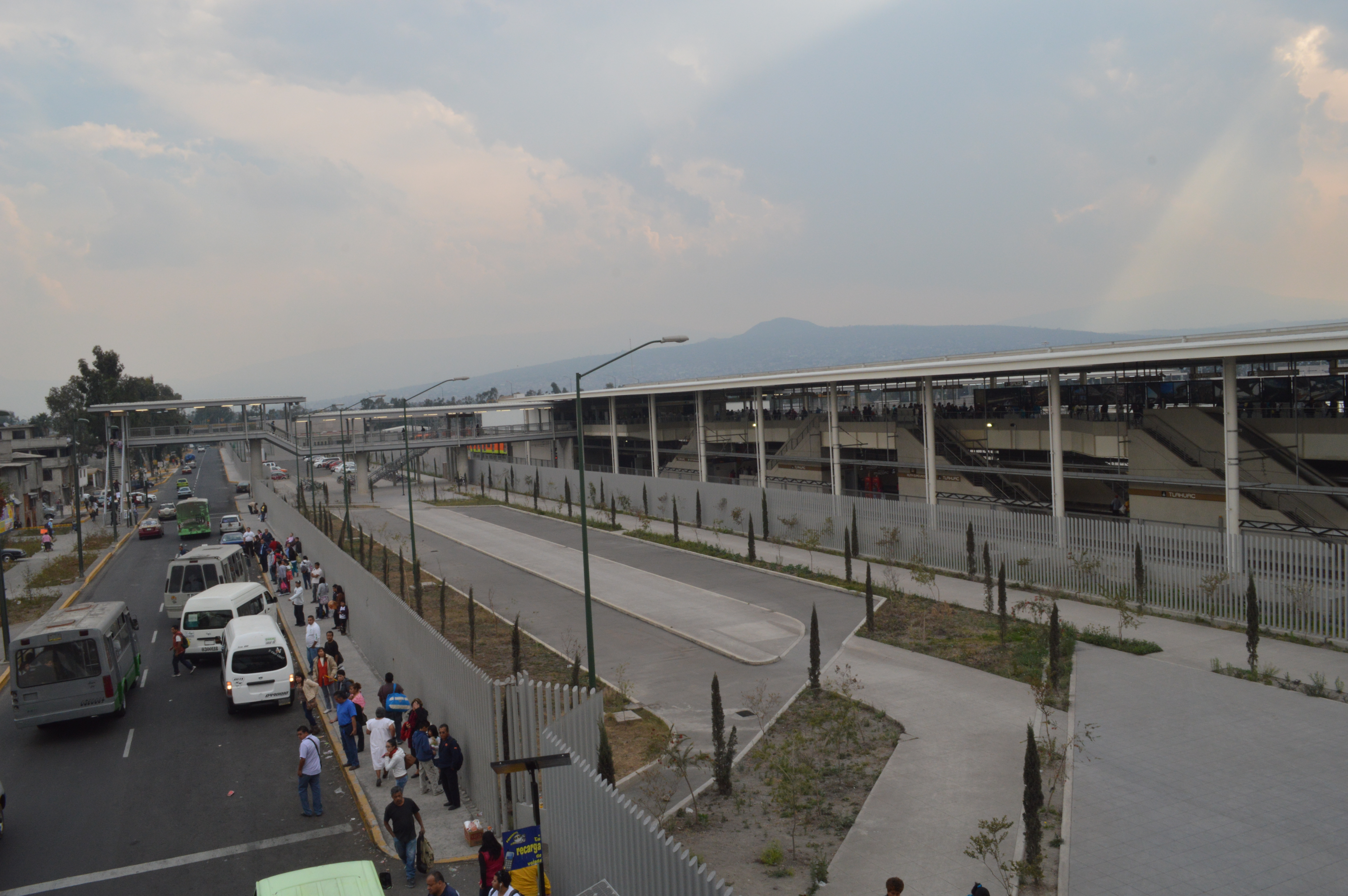
View of the Tláhuac terminal and bus stop

Transportation for the borough connects the area with neighboring boroughs and the State of Mexico. The Most important road is Avenida Tláhuac, which crosses almost the entire territory, followed by Anillo Periférico and the Mexico City-Tulyehualco road. Road traffic is heavy and congested during many hours of the day, including weekends. Some of the worst traffic in the borough is in Santiago Tulyehualco, where various major roads such as Aquiles Serdan, Francisco Presa, the Tlahuac-Tulyehualco road and Isidro Tapia all converge. There are both public and private bus lines, mostly working out of four official bus stations. There is also one taxi station but there are also a large number of informal bicycle taxis, motorcycle taxis and taxis converted from golf carts because of the lack of organized public transportation in a number of areas.

A major change in public transportation is the completion of Line 12 of the Mexico City Metro, which a terminal in Tláhuac. The construction of the line into the borough was controversial. One argument was that it would worsen the already bad traffic congestion by encouraging more urban sprawl. Ejido members protested the appropriation of the Ejido of San Francisco Tlaltenco in order to build the terminal. The establishment of the terminal Tláhuac caused a struggle between bus operators in the Federal District and neighboring State of Mexico for rights to transport passengers between the station and points in the State of Mexico, especially the suburb of Chalco. Residents complained that construction of the line left Avenida Tláhuac in poor condition for local traffic and pedestrians.

Metro stations

- Periférico Oriente
- Tezonco
- Olivos
- Nopalera
- Zapotitlán
- Tlaltenco
- Tláhuac
