= Festival Ceremonia =

Music festival in Mexico City, Mexico

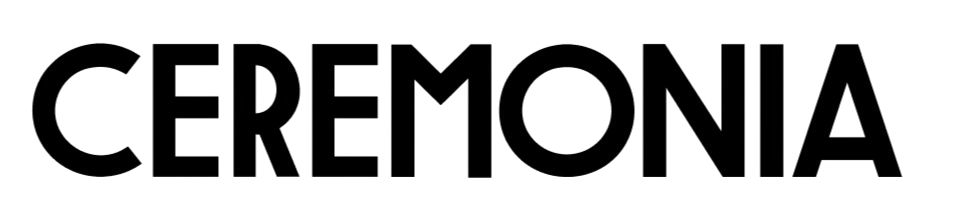
- Genre: Alternative rock, electronica, contemporary R&B, neo soul, hip hop
- Frequency: Annually
- Venue: Bicentennial Park
- Locations: Mexico City, Mexico
- Years active: 2013–2019; 2022–present
- Inaugurated: 14 September 2013
- Founder: Diego Jiménez Labora
- Most recent: 5 April 2025
- Website: axeceremonia.com

Ceremonia, known for sponsorship reasons as AXE Ceremonia, is a music festival that takes place in Mexico City. Once a one day-festival, it became a multi-day festival showcasing major international and local alternative acts. Throughout the years since its inception in 2013, attendance has rapidly increased and Ceremonia is now one of Mexico's biggest music festivals, and one of the most important alternative music festivals in Latin America. The musical style of Ceremonia is similar to European festivals such as Primavera Sound and Roskilde, focusing on alternative rock, electronica, contemporary R&B, neo soul and hip hop, with prominent figures of alt-reggaeton and corridos tumbados being featured as well.

Among the headliners that have played at Ceremonia are Tyler, the Creator, Snoop Dogg, Björk, Beck, Massive Attack, ASAP Rocky, Travis Scott, LCD Soundsystem and Kendrick Lamar, alongside many of the major acts of the Spanish-speaking music scene, such as Natanael Cano, Rosalía, Julieta Venegas, C. Tangana, Tainy and Fuerza Regida. The festival has also featured sets from DJs and alternative dance acts like Gesaffelstein, Underworld, Aphex Twin, Kaytranada, Arca and Peggy Gou.

== History ==
The festival was created by Diego Jiménez Labora, who came up with the idea of holding a festival of alternative music with inclusive activities and spaces. The name Ceremonia comes from the Joy Division-written song "Ceremony", which Jiménez considered as a "reference to alternative music". After being originally planned to be held at Parque Ecológico de Xochimilco in Mexico City, the first edition of the festival was held on 14 September 2013, at Centro Dinámico Pegaso in Toluca.

Following seven editions and a two years absence due to the COVID-19 pandemic, the site of Ceremonia was moved further to the Parque Bicentenario in Mexico City for the eighth edition in 2022. Additionally, the 2023 edition became the first year of the festival to take place over two days.

== Line-ups by year ==
=== 2013 ===
The first edition of the festival took place on 14 September 2013.

- Animal Collective
- Justice
- Busy P
- Breakbot
- Nicolas Jaar
- Toro y Moi
- Gang Gang Dance
- XXYYXX
- Nosaj Thing
- beGun
- Oneohtrix Point Never
- Centavrvs
- Yesco
- Little Jesus
- Mentira Mentira
- Simpson Ahuevo
- Club 303

=== 2014 ===
The second edition of the festival took place on 16 August 2014.

Cerveza León Stage:

- Julian Casablancas & The Voidz
- Tyler, the Creator
- ASAP Ferg
- Flying Lotus
- Zurdok
- Ty Segall
- Theophilus London
- Suuns
- Unknown Mortal Orchestra
- Hawaiian Gremlins

Ceremonia Stage:

- Damian Lazarus
- !!!
- Jacques Greene
- Tycho
- How to Dress Well
- Adán Cruz
- Juan Soto
- Clubz

Vans Off the Wall Stage:

- L-Vis 1990 vs Kingdom
- Toy Selectah
- Daniel Maloso
- Erick Rincón
- Sanfuentes
- Teen Flirt
- Lao
- Los Mekanikos

=== 2015 ===
The third edition of the festival took place on 9 May 2015.

Corona Stage:

- Snoop Dogg
- The Horrors
- Jungle
- Chet Faker
- Melody's Echo Chamber
- The Wookies
- Fuete Billete
- Los Nastys
- El Triple Filtro

Vans Off the Wall Stage:

- Green Velvet
- Art Department
- Daniel Avery
- Disco Ruido
- Pusha T
- Kaytranada
- Kali Uchis
- Kryone
- Yoga Fire

Camp Roswell Stage:

- Zombies in Miami
- Royal Highness
- Zutzut and Ezekiel
- AAAA
- Mate
- Trillones
- Raido

=== 2016 ===
The fourth edition of the festival took place on 9 April 2016.

Corona Stage:

- Disclosure
- Flume
- Gesaffelstein
- Bob Moses
- Classixx
- Ryan Hemsworth
- Salón Acapulco
- Los Blenders

Vans Off the Wall Stage:

- Nas
- Z-Trip
- Titan
- RL Grime
- Anderson .Paak & The Free Nationals
- Thundercat
- Álvaro Díaz
- C. Tangana
- Jesse Baez
- Marineros

Absolut Camp Roswell Stage:

- Total Freedom
- Anna Lunoe
- Clumbers & Louie Fresco
- Alizzz
- Gaika
- Superstudio
- Finesse All Stars
- Synty Mverte
- Alemán
- Theus Mago
- Yasupopoi

=== 2017 ===
The fifth edition of the festival took place on 2 April 2017. It was originally scheduled to take place the day before, but it was rescheduled due to weather conditions.

Vans Off the Wall Stage:

- Björk
- M.I.A.
- Beach House
- Majid Jordan
- Vince Staples
- DRAM
- La Banda Bastón
- Simpson Ahuevo
- AJ Dávila

Corona Stage:

- Underworld
- James Blake
- Nicolas Jaar
- Snakehips
- What So Not
- Gallant
- Rey Pila
- Madame Gandhi
- Sotomayor

Camp Roswell Stage:

- Mija
- The Black Madonna
- Floating Points
- Hapax Legomenon
- Virgil Abloh
- River Tiber
- Buscabulla
- BrunoG
- Kau Mutsa
- Tayrell

=== 2018 ===
The sixth edition of the festival took place on 7 April 2018.

Ceremonia Stage:

- Beck
- St. Vincent
- King Krule
- Bomba Estéreo
- A. Chal
- Cuco
- Wet Baes
- Tayrell

Corona Stage:

- Soulwax
- Rae Sremmurd
- Caribou
- Mura Masa
- Kinder Malo & Pimp Flaco
- Broke Kids
- Girl Ultra
- Mint Field

Camp Roswell Stage:

- Four Tet
- Cashmere Cat
- Arca
- C. Tangana
- Kelela
- Tommy Genesis
- Berhana
- Lophile
- Fntxy

Traición Dome:

- Tayhana
- Linn da Quebrada
- Mexican Jihad
- Perreo Pesado
- Born in Flamez
- Derré Tidá
- Audri Nix

=== 2019 ===
The seventh edition of the festival took place on 6 April 2019.

Vivir es increíble Stage:

- Massive Attack
- Rosalía
- Khruangbin
- Little Jesus
- Pabllo Vittar
- La Plebada
- Roy Blair
- Kuro Deko

Corona Stage:

- Aphex Twin
- Kaytranada
- DJ Koze
- Parcels
- Pussy Riot
- Bad Gyal
- Ambar Lucid
- Tessa Ía

Absolut Stage:

- The Blaze
- Modeselektor
- Jon Hopkins
- Yaeji
- Denzel Curry
- Clubz
- Flohio
- Aquihayaquihay

Traición Tent:

- Marie Davidson
- Faka
- Young Boy Dancing Group
- Debit
- Serpentwithfeet
- Ian Isiah
- Defensa

=== 2020 ===
The 2020 edition of the festival was due to take place on 25 April with The Chemical Brothers, Thom Yorke and FKA Twigs announced as headliners. The site for the festival this year was planned to be moved to Campo Marte in Mexico City. However, on 16 March 2020, it was announced that Ceremonia had been postponed due to the coronavirus pandemic, and had been rescheduled for the second half of the year. On 1 October, it was announced that the 2020 event would not take place, and had been rescheduled for 2021. Nevertheless, the festival had to be wrapped up until the eighth edition in 2022.

=== 2022 ===
The eighth edition of the festival took place on 2 April 2022. For the first time, the festival was held in Mexico City, specifically at the Parque Bicentenario.

Ceremonia Stage:

- Wu-Tang Clan
- Bicep
- C. Tangana
- Natanael Cano
- Nicki Nicole
- Molchat Doma
- Robot95
- Samantha Barrón
- Mathilde Sobrino

Corona Stage:

- ASAP Rocky
- Tainy
- Nathy Peluso
- Nicola Cruz
- Snow Tha Product
- Drama
- Sticky M.A.
- Noah Pino Palo

Traición Stage:

- Arca
- Channel Tres
- Tokischa
- Shygirl
- Eartheater
- Erika de Casier
- Brujx Prieta
- La Pocha Nostra
- Mexican Jihad
- Lechedevirgen
- Pepx Romerx
- Derretida
- Selene
- Blue Rojo

=== 2023 ===
The ninth edition of the festival took place on 1 and 2 April 2023. It was the first edition of the festival to take place over more than one day.

Festival Ceremonia 2023 line-up by date and stage schedules
Saturday, 1 April	Sunday, 2 April
AXE Ceremonia Stage
Travis Scott; Tokischa; Junior H; Eme Malefe; El Malilla; Yoshi	Rosalía; M.I.A; Julieta Venegas; Taichu; Foudequish; Rubio
GPI Stage
Fred Again; L'Impératrice; Moderat; Domi and JD Beck; Usted Señálemelo; Opium G; Cuauh	Jamie xx; The Blaze; Trueno; Louta; Nsqk; Meth Math
American Eagle Stage
Honey Dijon; Avalon Emerson; Tayhana; Villano Antillano; Ethel Cain; Rebe; Mehro; Zemmoa	TR/ST; Rojuu; La Goony Chonga; Friolento; Go Golden Junk; Zizzy; Grls
Traición Club
Chippy Nonstop; Lukas Avendaño + Muxx; Loris; SadGal + DJ Fucci; Pepx Romero; Mexican Jihad; Josh Steers	DJ Guapis; Regal 86; Villaseñor; Ruisseñor vs Kodemul; La Fulminante; Pepx Romero; Derretida
El Micky Lounge by Hennessy
DJ Bear; DJ Secreto; Blue Rojo; Sussyoh; Aretrips	DJ Bear; Jacinto DJ; Ali Gua Gua; Rulo; Sussyoh

=== 2024 ===
The tenth edition of the festival took place on 23 and 24 March 2024.

Festival Ceremonia 2024 line-up by date and stage schedules
Saturday, 23 March	Sunday, 24 March
AXE Ceremonia Stage
Kendrick Lamar; Álvaro Díaz; Sampha; Soto Asa; Gale; Pink Pablo	LCD Soundsystem; Four Tet; James Blake; Sevdaliza; Justin Morales; Akrilla
Nike Air Max Stage
Grimes; Charlotte de Witte; Romy; Rusowsky; Leisure; Lil Ziphie	Fuerza Regida; Peggy Gou; Kenia Os; Bad Gyal; RaiNao; Joaquina Mertz
American Eagle Stage
Floating Points; Yves Tumor; Étienne de Crécy Boombas DJ Falcon; Jean Dawson; Underscores; Akasha	Arca; Overmono; DJ Poi Poi; El Bogueto; Bb Trickz; Lara Project
Traición Club
Chico Blanco; Toccororo; Tyler Matthew Oyer; Pepx Romero; Mexican Jihad; Torina Moreno; Astrid Hadad; Iris Estefanía	Dorian Electra; Arieshandmodel; BClip; Six Sex; Kebra; Pepx Romero; Diego Vega; Derretida
El Micky / La Diáspora Lounge
DJ Bear; Tony Gallardo; Aretrips; Shainy; Rulo; Sussyoh	Wizah; B.Smile; Olea; Black Daria; Bastian Bell; Liah; Steve; Samia

=== 2025 ===
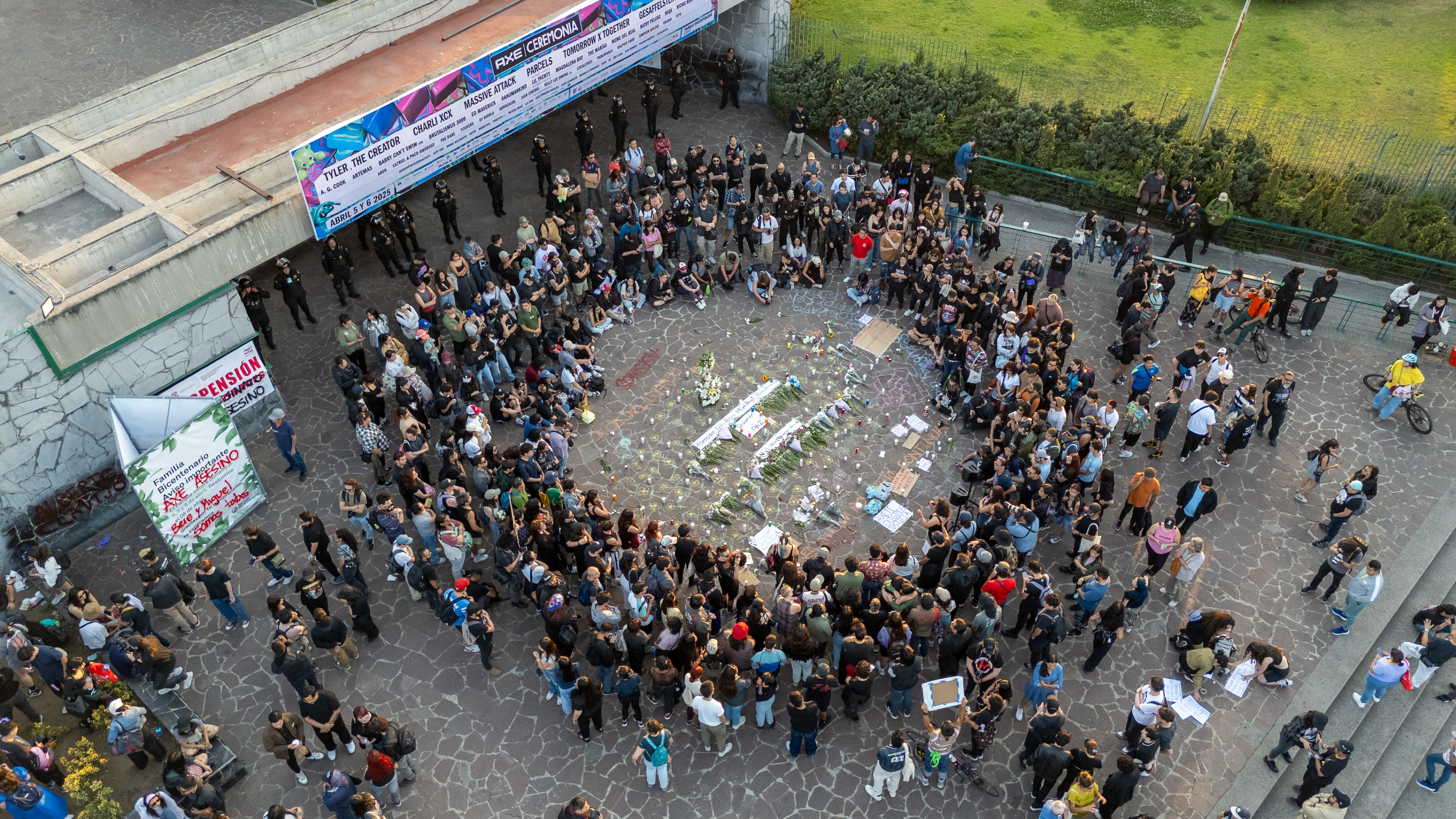
People protesting the deaths of Berenice Giles and Miguel Ángel Rojas following the collapse of an aerial lift (es)

The eleventh edition of the festival was set to take place on 5 and 6 April 2025. On 5 April, amid strong winds around 5 p.m, a scissor lift collapsed, killing Berenice Giles and Miguel Ángel Rojas, both photographers. The festival was not suspended until after midnight, and the concert the following day was canceled.

Festival Ceremonia 2025 line-up by date and stage schedules
Saturday, 5 April	Sunday, 6 April
AXE Ceremonia Stage
Natanael Cano; Parcels; Magdalena Bay; Meme del Real; Juan Cirerol; Valgur	Tyler, the Creator; Nsqk; Lil Yachty; Ca7riel & Paco Amoroso; Legallyrxx; Telescreens
American Eagle Stage
Charli XCX; Tomorrow X Together; Hanumankind; Ralphie Choo; Aron; Luisa Almaguer	Massive Attack; The Marías; Gesaffelstein; Nathy Peluso; AgusFortnite2008 & Stiffy; Day2k; ~~FKA Twigs~~ (Cancelled)
Spotify Stage
Barry Can't Swim; A. G. Cook; The Dare; Simpson Ahuevo; Artemas; Yeyo; PabloPablo; Iza TKM	Brutalismus 3000; Kelly Lee Owens; Richie Hawtin; Ed Maverick; Fcukers; Nash; OG
Traición Club by Dos Equis
DJ Gigola; Magnolia Coronado; Piolinda Marcela; Orly Anan; Pepx Romero; Derretida	HorsegiirL; Bobby Beethoven; Foreplay; Hetera Friné; Pepx Romero
El Micky Lounge / Barba Azul Cabaret
DJ Bear; DJ Cara; Matías; Shainy; Cam & Pam; Blue Rojo; Bruja de Texcoco; 3mita & DJ Suavecito; Tibu & Cato; Rulo; Maxi	Experiencia Barba Azul; Los del Son; Orquesta Inmensidad de México
