= Pitchfork Music Festival Paris 2018 =

- Dates: 1–3 November 2018
- Locations: Grande halle de la Villette, Paris, France
- Website: pitchforkmusicfestival.fr

The Pitchfork Music Festival Paris 2018 was held from 1 to 3 November 2018 at the Grande halle de la Villette, Paris, France. It was headlined by Bon Iver, Kaytranada, and Mac DeMarco.

The festival was preceded by block party Avant-Garde, held in various venues around Paris on 1 and 2 November. Each day, the festival was closed with afterparties and Club Night, held at the Le Trabendo on the first two nights and Grande halle de la Villette during the last day.

== Headlining set lists ==
Mac DeMarco
1. "On the Level"
2. "Salad Days"
3. "No Other Heart"
4. "The Stars Keep On Calling My Name"
5. "This Old Dog"
6. "Cooking Up Something Good"
7. "My Old Man"
8. "Ode to Viceroy"
9. "One More Love Song"
10. "Freaking Out the Neighborhood"
11. "Rock and Roll Night Club"
12. "My Kind of Woman"
13. "Chamber of Reflection"
14. "Still Together"

Encore

15. "Hollywood Babylon" (Misfits cover)
16. "Where Eagles Dare" (Misfits cover)
17. "Hybrid Moments" (Misfits cover)
18. "Still Together (Reprise)"
Kaytranada
1. "TOGETHER"
2. "The Glow of Love"
3. "All Night"
4. "Roll (Burbank Funk)"
5. "ONE TOO MANY"
6. "Kiss of Life"
7. "She Wants to Move"
8. "Be Your Girl"
9. "10%"
10. "KAYTRANADA_WAITIN_115 BPM"
11. "Vivid Dreams"
12. "Kaleidoscope Love"
13. "What's It Gonna Be?!"
14. "Halla"
15. "Track Uno"
16. "Meditation"
17. "Bubblin'"
18. "Killa Cats"
19. "Sock It 2 Me"
20. "Girl"
21. "Got It Good"
22. "Glowed Up"
23. "At All"
24. "ATM Jam"
25. "Lite Spots"
26. "You're the One"
27. "Leave Me Alone"
28. "Cranes In the Sky"
29. "If"
Bon Iver
1. "666 ʇ"
2. "10 d E A T h b R E a s T"
3. "715 - CREEKS"
4. "Heavenly Father"
5. "29 #Strafford APTS"
6. "Beach Baby"
7. "Wash."
8. "Perth"
9. "Minnesota, WI"
10. "Michicant"
11. "8 (circle)"
12. "33 “GOD”"
13. "Blood Bank"
14. "____45_____"
15. "Creature Fear"
16. "Calgary"
17. "Woods"
18. "22 (OVER S∞∞N)"

== Line-ups ==
Headline performers are listed in boldface. Artists listed from latest to earliest set times.

Thursday, 1 November	Friday, 2 November	Saturday, 3 November
**Mac DeMarco**; The Voidz; Étienne Daho; John Maus; Yellow Days; Rolling Blackouts Coastal Fever; Cola Boyy; New Optimism (Miho Hatori)	**Kaytranada** (Note: Fever Ray was supposed to headline the festival but cancelled their tour dates due to anxiety and panic attacks. They were replaced by Kaytranada.); Blood Orange; Chvrches; Bagarre; Chromeo; Car Seat Headrest; Lewis OfMan; Dream Wife; Tirzah; Boy Pablo	**Bon Iver**; Unknown Mortal Orchestra; Stephen Malkmus and the Jicks; Snail Mail; Muddy Monk; Michael Rault

=== Avant-Garde and After Parties line-ups ===
Artists listed from latest to earliest set times.

Café de la Danse
Tuesday, 30 October	Wednesday, 31 October
Let's Eat Grandma; IDER; Lauren Auder	Cautious Clay; Kelsey Lu; Naaz

Reservoir
Tuesday, 30 October	Wednesday, 31 October
Alaskalaska; Holiday Sidewinder; Weakened Friends	Sasami; Mint Field; Black Midi

Pan Piper
Tuesday, 30 October	Wednesday, 31 October
Apollo Noir; Westerman; Mellah; Wicca Phase Springs Eternal	Trevor Powers; O - Olivier Marguerit; Anemone; Palm

POPUP!
Tuesday, 30 October	Wednesday, 31 October
Jockstrap; Grand Pax; Khadyak	Anaïs; Buzzy Lee; Suzi Wu

Badaboum
Tuesday, 30 October	Wednesday, 31 October
Jimothy Lacoste; JPEGMafia; RIMON; Kiran Kai	slowthai; Kojey Radical; Biig Piig; Etta Bond

La Chapelle des Lombards
Tuesday, 30 October	Wednesday, 31 October
Stella Donnelly; Jack Grace; Sam Evian	Honey Harper; Gold Star; Helena Deland

Supersonic
Tuesday, 30 October	Wednesday, 31 October
Crumb; Starchild & the New Romantic; Hop Along	Yuno; Hatchie; Madison McFerrin

After Parties
Thursday, 1 November	Friday, 2 November	Club Night Saturday, 3 November
Yves Tumor (Note: Sophie was announced to perform but cancelled. She was replaced by Yves Tumor.); Lotic; Dr Rubinstein; Or:la	Honey Dijon; DJ Seinfeld; Gabe Gurnsey; Perel	Daniel Avery; Avalon Emerson; Peggy Gou; DJ Koze; Jeremy Underground
