= Music Can Hear Us =

Studio album by DJ Koze
- Released: 4 April 2025
- Genre: Electropop; house; techno
- Length: 65:29
- Label: Pampa
- Producer: DJ Koze

DJ Koze chronology
Knock Knock (2018)	Music Can Hear Us (2025)

Music Can Hear Us is the fourth studio album by German electronic musician DJ Koze. It was released on 4 April 2025 through Pampa Records. It marks his first studio album in seven years, following Knock Knock, and features guest appearances by Damon Albarn, Arnim Teutoburg-Weiß of Beatsteaks, Soap&Skin, Sofia Kourtesis, and long-time collaborator Sophia Kennedy, amongst others.

== Background ==
Ahead of its release, Koze described the album as "the most potent legal drug" and "a cosmic synapse rodeo". He named it after a belief that music is able to offer what is needed "in this trying time", echoing "our pain, our destiny, our euphoria, our wishes, our demands" which is "somehow political also". The artwork for the album was painted by his girlfriend Gepa Hinrichsen.

== Critical reception ==
Professional ratings
Aggregate scores
Source	Rating
Metacritic	75/100
Review scores
Source	Rating
The Guardian	4/5 stars
Mojo	3/5 stars
Pitchfork	8.8/10
Rolling Stone	3/5 stars
Musikexpress	5/6 stars

On Metacritic, which assigns a normalized score out of 100 to ratings from mainstream publications, the album received "generally favorable reviews" based on a weighted average score of 75 out of 100 from five critic scores. Walden Green of Pitchfork awarded Music Can Hear Us the distinction of Best New Music and argued that the album could be "the defining project" of his career. Green went on to call it an "extended attempt to rewild that which has been made palatable, sociable, and civilized" with a dream of "pure love loves purely" that the artist made "feel a little more in reach" with the project.

Shaad D'Souza at The Guardian thought that Music Can Hear Us picked up "roughly" where Knock Knock "left off" in 2018, creating a "warm and mellow" atmosphere with "hazy electropop songs interspersed with thumping house and techno tracks". And while it did not "feel quite as refined" as Knock Knock to D'Souza, the album takes the listener on a journey "that only Koze can really take". Writing for Rolling Stone, Michaelangelo Matos noticed that the project was designed "to gradually gain rhythmic mass" with "a lot of time and pointless frippery to get there" to the point that it felt "merely indulgent" to them. However, they argued that the album "picks up considerably" towards the end, highlight songs like "Die Gondel" and "Buschtaxi".

== Track listing ==
Music Can Hear Us track listing
No.	Title	Writer(s)	Length
1.	"The Universe in a Nutshell"	Stefan Kozalla	7:53
2.	"Pure Love" (featuring Damon Albarn)	Kozalla; Damon Albarn	4:24
3.	"Der Fall" (featuring Sophia Kennedy)	Sophia Kennedy; Inéz Schaefer	3:27
4.	"Wie schön du bist" (featuring Arnim and the Düsseldorf Düsterboys)	Ingeburg Branoner; Arnim Teutoburg-Weiß; Peter Rubel; Pedro Gonçalves Crecenti	3:47
5.	"Tu Dime Cuando" (featuring Ada and Sofia Kourtesis)	Kozalla; Inéz; Sofia Kourtesis	4:01
6.	"The Talented Mr. Tripley"	Kozalla	3:13
7.	"What About Us" (featuring Markus Archer and the Notwist)	Markus Acher; Micha Acher	4:47
8.	"Unbelievable" (featuring Ada)	Michaela Dippel; F. Weissmantel	4:31
9.	"A Dónde Vas?" (featuring Soap&Skin)	Kozalla	3:45
10.	"Vamos a la playa" (featuring Soap&Skin)	Stefano Righi	1:20
11.	"Die Gondel" (featuring Sophia Kennedy)	Kennedy	3:36
12.	"Brushcutter" (featuring Marley Waters)	Brendon Allyn Waters	4:31
13.	"Buschtaxi"	Kennedy	8:36
14.	"Aruna"	Kozalla	3:54
15.	"Umaoi" (featuring Marewrew)	Rekpo; Hisae; Mayunkiki; RimRim	3:44
Total length:			65:29

== Charts ==
Chart performance for Music Can Hear Us
Chart (2025)	Peak position
Austrian Albums (Ö3 Austria)	18
German Albums (Offizielle Top 100)	4
Swiss Albums (Schweizer Hitparade)	69
UK Album Downloads (OCC)	41
UK Dance Albums (OCC)	3
UK Independent Albums (OCC)	37
