= International Pony =

- International Pony

Background information
- Origin: Hamburg, Germany
- Genres: Funk and electro
- Years active: 1998–2010
- Labels: Skint Records, Columbia
- Members: Stefan Kozalla, Daniel Sommer, Erobique
- Website: www.internationalpony.de

International Pony was a band from Hamburg, Germany. It was formed in 1998 by Stefan Kozalla also known as DJ Koze, Daniel Sommer also known as Cosmic DJ, and by Carsten Meyer well known as Erobique. International Pony have released the albums We love Music (2002), Bass is Boss (2004) and Mit Dir Sind Wir Vier (2006). The band dissolved in 2010.

Their combination of funk and electro led them to various remixing gigs.

DJ Koze and Cosmic DJ both were members of Fischmob band before forming the new band International Pony.

== Discography ==
=== Albums ===
- We Love Music (2002, Skint Records)
- Bass Is Boss (2004, Columbia) – remix and video album
- Mit Dir sind wir vier (2006, Columbia)

=== Singles ===
- "Leaving Home" (2002)
- "Hangin 'Around" (2002)
- "My Mouth" (2003)
- "Gothic Girl" (2006)
- "Our House"
- "The Sweet Madness"

The song "Leaving Home" was the theme song in the 2009 show Into the Night with Rick Dees.
