= Bicentennial Park (Mexico City) =

Metropolitan park in Mexico City

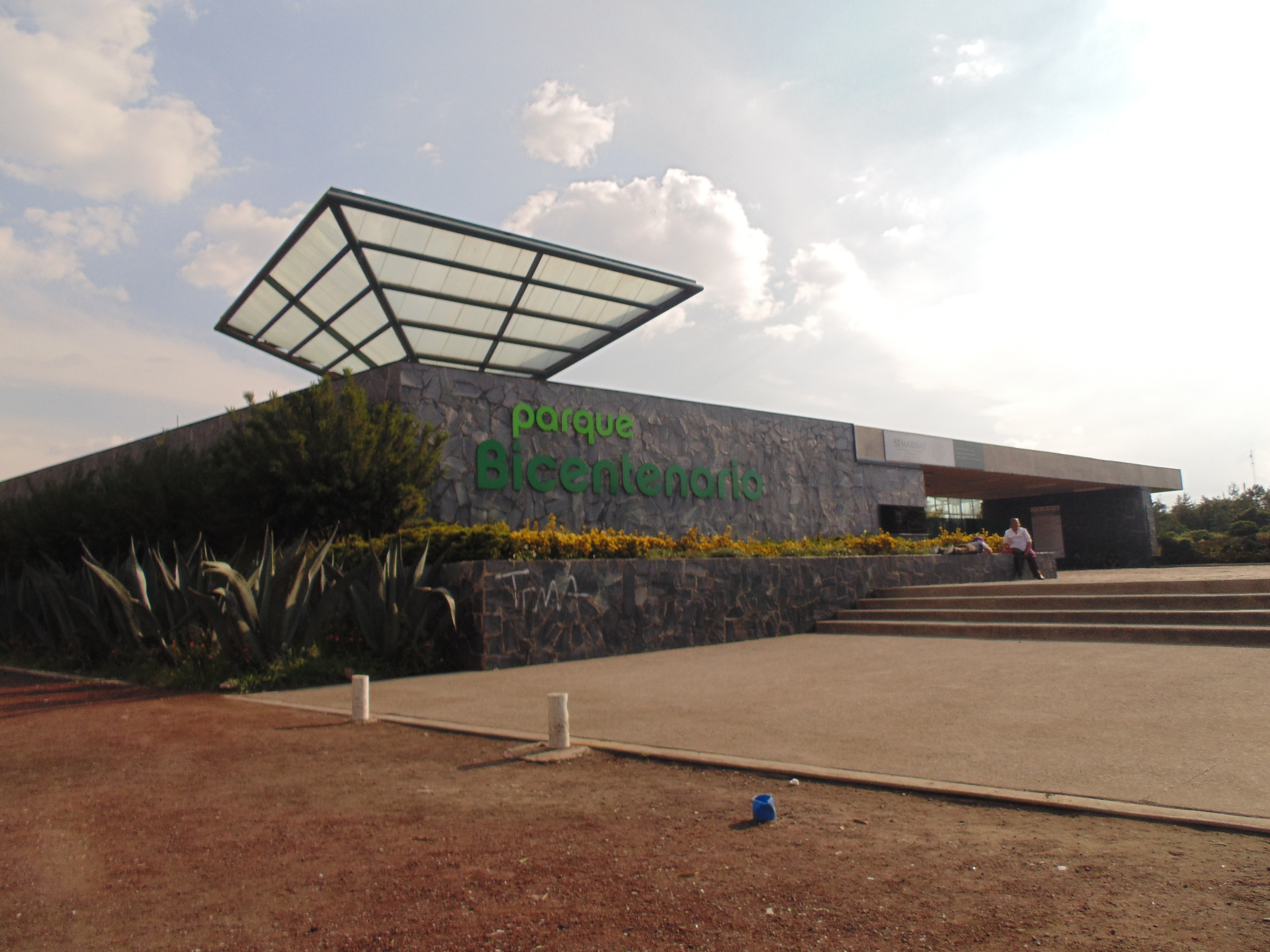
- Park entrance
- Interactive map of Bicentennial Park
- Type: Urban park
- Location: Mexico City, Mexico
- Coordinates: 19°28′11″N 99°11′49″W
- Created: 2007
- Open: 2010
- Public transit: Refinería metro station

Bicentennial Park (Spanish: Parque Bicentenario) is a park in Mexico City. It is located in the western part of the city, on the boundary of Azcapotzalco and Miguel Hidalgo. It was built as part of the Celebration of the Bicentennial of the Independence of Mexico and inaugurated by then President Felipe Calderón on November 7, 2010. This park is ten times larger than the Plaza de la Constitución in downtown Mexico City and the second largest "lung" in the city.

Admission to the park is free and hours are from 7 a.m. to 6 p.m.

== Construction ==
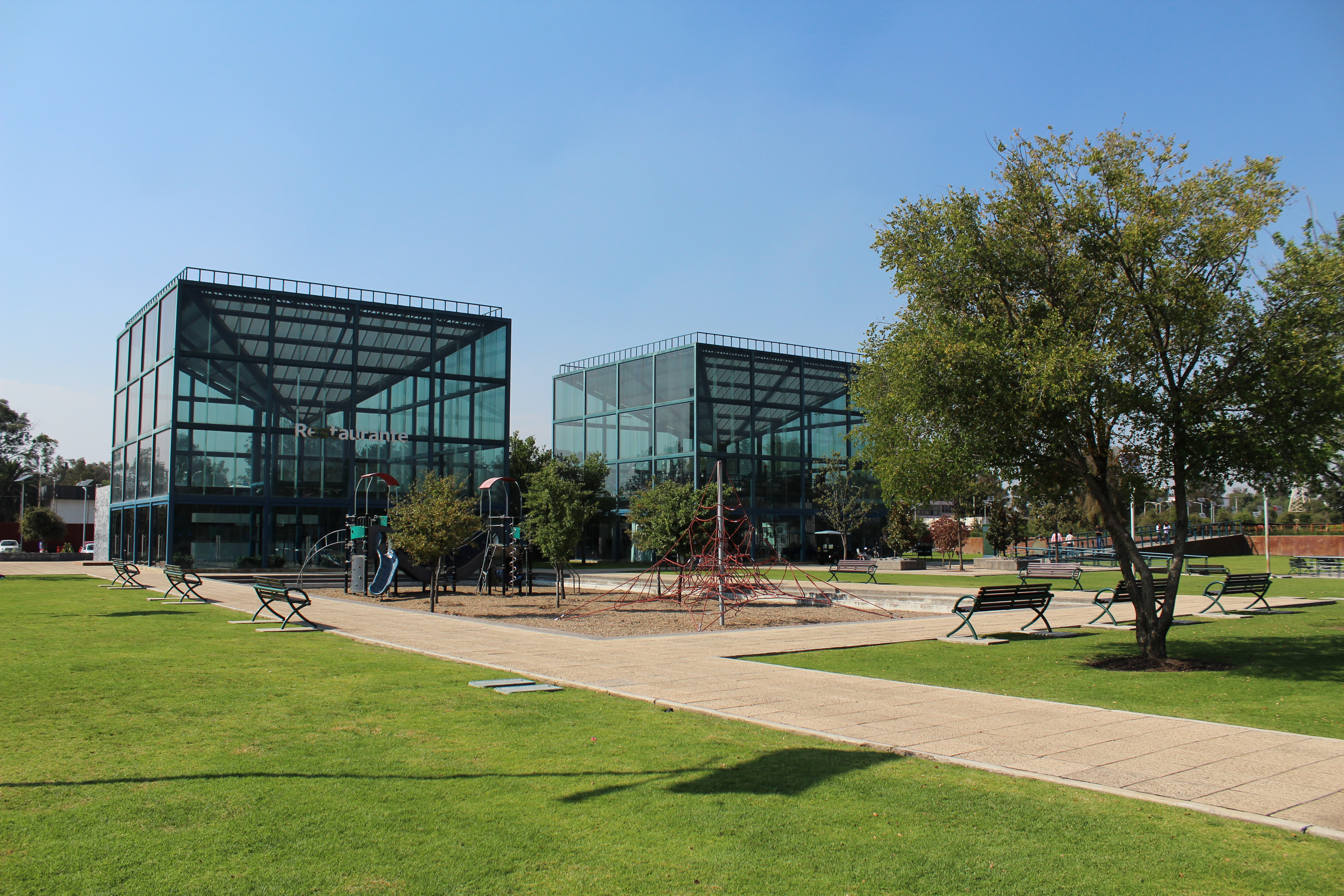
Nature garden at the park

The development proposal for this green area started in 1991 when the Azcapotzalco Refinery of Petróleos Mexicanos (Pemex) was closed due to serious pollution problems that it created in its immediate vicinity and for the entire Metropolitan Area of the Valley of Mexico. After more than ten years of abandonment, the land from the former refinery was ceded by Pemex to the Federal Government in 2007. That year, environmental remediation of the property began, which was led by the state, para-state, several public universities of Mexico as well as international advisors. Once the existing contaminants on the property were reduced, the landscape architecture work began, which was carried out by a multidisciplinary group headed by Mario Schjetnan, the visionary behind other green areas such as the Tezozomoc Park or the Xochimilco Ecological Park.

The park has an ecological facility inside which 7 different climates and representative vegetation types of the country are recreated, as well as an experimental chinampa, artificial lake, an orchid garden, an auditorium and various sports facilities. The works were carried out by the federal government company Fonatur Constructora, carrying out the last of the work in 2011.

== Operations ==
On October 12, 2017, during the administration of Enrique Peña Nieto, Secretariat of Environment and Natural Resources (Semarnat) handed over the administration of the park to the Institute of Administration and Appraisals of National Assets (INDAABIN), who in turn handed over operations it to the private company Operator of Entertainment Projects (Operadora de Proyectos de Entretenimiento NLP) on March 1, 2018, for 25 years. Semarnat argued that it did not have the budget for the maintenance of the park, but that it would continue to be publicly accessible.

Neighborhood organizations and groups pointed out that the company has neglected the green areas of the park, since they profit from it to hold massive events and this "violates their right to a healthy environment, health and culture."

Since the park management changed, access to the parking lot has a charge, some bathrooms are no longer open, the International Youth Book Fair is no longer held, the museum does not offer exhibitions, and the water treatment plant does not work. Likewise, it has been pointed out that the axolotls that had been introduced to the chinampa died.

=== Incidents ===
On July 21, 2023, Alberto Clavijo died after stepping on an unmarked false ceiling and falling two stories while photographing an RBD concert.

On April 5, 2025, two photographers died when a scissor lift collapsed due to strong winds in the park. The lifts had mesh tarps installed, which caused wind uplift, and these were placed after a civil protection inspection to mark reference points during the AXE Ceremonia festival. The collapse occurred around 5 p.m., but the festival was not suspended until later that evening, after several musical performances. The concert the following day was canceled.

== Park gardens ==
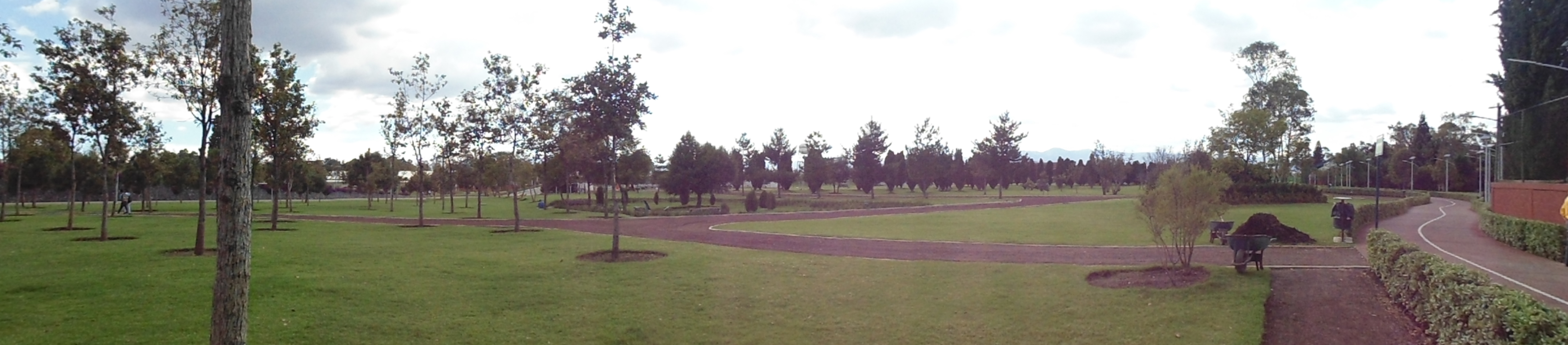
Panorama of the park

The park has 55 hectares, which have been divided into five gardens:

- Wind
- Water
- Nature
- Sun
- Land

== Transportation ==
A few meters from its main entrance is the Refinería station on Line 7 of the Mexico City Metro.
