= Nsqk =

Mexican rapper (born 1998)

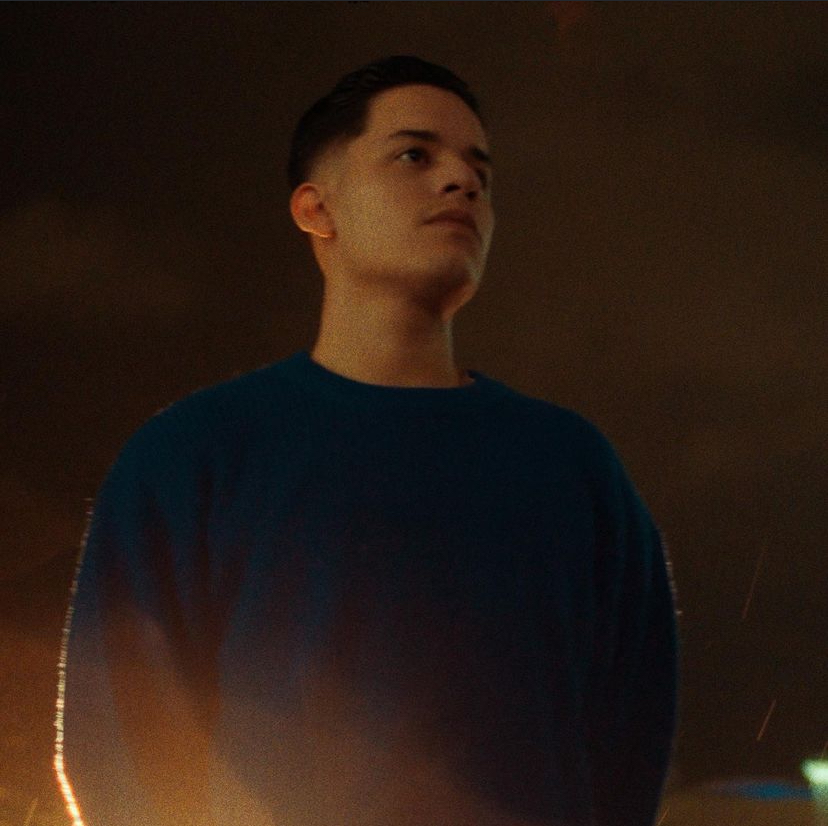
- Nsqk performing in 2021

Background information
- Born: Rodrigo Torres de la Garza; 27 April 1998 (age 28); Monterrey, Mexico
- Genres: pop; urbano; R&B; reggaeton; hip hop
- Occupations: Rapper; musician; producer; singer-songwriter
- Years active: 2019–present
- Label: Honey Records

Rodrigo Torres de la Garza (born April 27, 1998), known professionally as Nsqk (pronounced as Nesquik), is a Mexican rapper, singer-songwriter and producer.

== Early life ==
Torres was born in Monterrey, Mexico. He grew up in Houston, Texas, after moving with his family from an early age. He initially started recording music at the age of thirteen after discovering how tracks of Skrillex, Swedish House Mafia and Avicii were produced, using a laptop with a 97 version of Windows 95 installed.

His stage name originated when a friend on Instagram suggested ironically that Nsqk should be his artistic pseudonym, since Torres used the username "nsqkpapi" at the time as a mocking reference to Canadian rapper Drake and to monikers used by the members of ASAP Mob as well.

== Career ==
He released his debut EP Botánica in 2020 through the independent label Honey Records, which combined pop, rap, R&B, and EDM sounds. His debut full-length album, Roy, was released in late 2022, which led Torres to perform at various prestigious festivals throughout Latin America, such as Ceremonia in 2023 and Lollapalooza Chile in 2024.

In 2024, Torres co-wrote and was featured in "Mami 100pre Sabe", the tenth track on the third studio album of Puerto Rican rapper Álvaro Díaz, Sayonara. He released his debut mixtape ATP months later, with the inclusion of Mexican Twitch streamer and YouTuber El Mariana during interlude skits. The mixtape was named one of the best Latin rising-act albums of 2024 by Billboard, and was placed at number 82 on the year-end list of "The 100 Best Albums of 2024" by Rolling Stone.

== Discography ==
=== Studio albums ===
List of studio albums, with selected details
Title	Details
Roy	Released: 23 November 2022; Label: Honey Records; Format: LP, CD, digital download, streaming
Mosca	Released: 15 October 2026 Label: Honey Records Formats: LP, digital download, streaming

=== Mixtapes ===
List of mixtapes, with selected details
Title	Details
ATP	Released: 14 Aug 2024; Label: Honey Records; Formats: LP, CD, digital download, streaming

=== Extended plays ===
List of extended plays, with selected details
Title	Details
Botánica	Released: 31 January 2020; Label: Honey Records; Formats: digital download, streaming
