= DJ-Kicks: DJ Koze =

Compilation album by DJ Koze
- Released: June 15, 2015
- Genre: Electronic, Pop
- Length: 1:09:22
- Label: Studio !K7

DJ Koze chronology
Amygdala (2013)	DJ-Kicks: DJ Koze (2015)	Knock Knock (2018)

DJ-Kicks chronology
DJ-Kicks: Actress (2015)	DJ-Kicks: DJ-Koze (2015)	DJ-Kicks: Seth Troxler (2015)

Professional ratings
Aggregate scores
Source	Rating
Metacritic	81/100
Review scores
Source	Rating
AllMusic	3.5/5 stars
Clash	8/10
Pitchfork	8.0/10
PopMatters	8/10
Resident Advisor	4.1/5

DJ-Kicks: DJ Koze is a DJ mix album, mixed by DJ Koze. It was released on June 15, 2015 under the Studio !K7 independent record label as part of their DJ-Kicks series.

== Track listing ==
No.	Title	Artist(s)	Length
1.	"I Haven't Been Everywhere but It's on My List"	DJ Koze	4:01
2.	"Can't Get Used to Those?" (Kosi Edit) / "Ohara"	Dimlite / Efdemin	2:40
3.	"Dead Dogs Two" (Boards of Canada Remix)	Clouddead	3:33
4.	"Best of Times" (Instrumental)	Strong Arm Steady	4:07
5.	"Holiday" (Kosi & Fink's Edit)	Homeboy Sandman	3:09
6.	"Shame" (Instrumental)	Freddie Gibbs and Madlib	3:21
7.	"Camelblues" (Kosi Edit)	Mndsgn	3:25
8.	"Tears in the Typing Pool"	Broadcast	2:07
9.	"Carla"	Daniel Lanois	1:35
10.	"Come Get It (Tekstrumental)" / "Modern Family (Kosi Kos Mélange)"	Hi-Tek / The 2 Bears	3:40
11.	"It Hasn't Happened Yet"	William Shatner	3:32
12.	"In Stride"	Marker Starling	4:50
13.	"Hyuwee" (DJ Koze Remix)	Session Victim	5:55
14.	"Bring the Sun" (Kosi Edit)	Frank & Tony	6:50
15.	"Jaz" (Kosi Edit)	Marcel Fengler	6:20
16.	"Surrender" (Kosi Edit)	Portable featuring Lcio	6:55
17.	"Superstar"	The Gentle People	3:22
