= Cosmic DJ =

2014 video game

- Developer: GL33k
- Publisher: Devolver Digital
- Director: Matthew Piersall
- Designers: Damien Di Fede; Matthew Piersall; Eric Wenske
- Programmer: Damien Di Fede
- Artists: Eric Wenske; Amanda Williams
- Composer: Matthew Piersall
- Engine: Unity
- Platforms: Windows, OS X, iOS
- Release: October 30, 2014
- Genre: Music
- Mode: Single-player

Cosmic DJ is a 2014 music video game developed by American studio GL33k and published by Devolver Digital. In the game, the player must make music to save the Jamtenna Network.

== Gameplay ==
The player assumes the role of the Cosmic DJ, who must help rebuild the Jamtenna Network with music. To make music, the player is given synthesizers.

== Development and release ==
Cosmic DJ was developed by GL33k, an audio production company. Being their first game that is not contract work, it was set to release in 2014. Published by Devolver Digital, Cosmic DJ was part of the Humble Bundle in March 2014. In May 2014, the game was released for Steam in early access.

== Reception ==
Reception

Review scores
Publication	Score
TouchArcade	3.5/5 stars
PC World	4/5 stars

The music-making interface was well received for being simple to use. Hayden Dingman of PC World praised the game for being "entertaining to screw around". However, Kill Screen criticized the game's limitations, stating, " [...] once you get to grips with the basic it has no room for more advanced tailoring."
