= Knock Knock (DJ Koze album) =

Studio album by DJ Koze
- Released: 4 May 2018
- Genre: House; downtempo; microhouse; nu-disco; deep house; neo-psychedelia; techno; sampledelia
- Length: 78:29
- Label: Pampa
- Producer: DJ Koze

DJ Koze chronology
Amygdala (2013)	Knock Knock (2018)	Music Can Hear Us (2025)

Knock Knock is the third studio album by German electronic musician DJ Koze. It was recorded in Spain and released on 4 May 2018.

== Critical reception ==
Professional ratings
Aggregate scores
Source	Rating
AnyDecentMusic?	8.0/10
Metacritic	85/100
Review scores
Source	Rating
AllMusic	4/5 stars
The A.V. Club	A−
Exclaim!	8/10
The Guardian	4/5 stars
Mojo	4/5 stars
Pitchfork	8.8/10
Q	4/5 stars
Resident Advisor	4.4/5
Rolling Stone	4/5 stars
XLR8R	8.5/10

Knock Knock was ranked #3 on Pitchfork's list of best albums of 2018, with Ryan Dombal complimenting its varied styles and sounds, writing that the album is "a parallel musical universe, one based on a collector's knowledge and a sense of play, where the histories of dance music and hip-hop and psychedelia are all pulled together by the same gravitational force." Alex Petridis of The Guardian wrote: "[DJ Koze] has a knack of coming up with tunes that are hugely appealing, but never feel hackneyed or predictable; that sound like the work of a man with an appealingly odd, personal take on pop music in its multifarious forms."

== Music video ==
The official music video for "Pick Up", the second single from the album as of November 2021, has received over 4 million views on YouTube and quoted by DJ Koze as "A video which leaves space for your own imagination!" It was animated by Terlina Lie.

== Track listing ==
Credits adapted from GEMA. All tracks produced by DJ Koze.

No.	Title	Writer(s)	Length
1.	"Club der Ewigkeiten" ("Club of the eternities")	Stefan Kozalla	4:09
2.	"Bonfire"	Kozalla; Justin Vernon; Matthew McCaughan	5:25
3.	"Moving in a Liquid" (featuring Eddie Fummler)	Kozalla; Arne Diedrichson	4:40
4.	"Colors of Autumn" (featuring Speech)	Kozalla; Todd Thomas	4:24
5.	"Music on My Teeth" (featuring José González)	Kozalla; José González	4:16
6.	"This Is My Rock" (featuring Sophia Kennedy)	Kozalla; Sophia Kennedy; Carsten Beermann	3:59
7.	"Illumination" (featuring Róisín Murphy)	Kozalla; Róisín Murphy	4:31
8.	"Pick Up"	Kozalla; James Weatherly; Gene McFadden; John Whitehead; Ronald Rose	6:38
9.	"Planet Hase" (featuring Mano le tough)	Kozalla; Niall Mannion	5:11
10.	"Scratch That" (featuring Róisín Murphy)	Kozalla; Murphy	4:36
11.	"Muddy Funster" (featuring Kurt Wagner)	Kozalla; Kurt Wagner; Ada	5:24
12.	"Baby (How Much I LFO You)"	Kozalla	4:31
13.	"Jesus"	Kozalla	5:13
14.	"Lord Knows"	Kozalla	4:07
15.	"Seeing Aliens"	Kozalla	4:51
16.	"Drone Me Up, Flashy" (featuring Sophia Kennedy)	Kozalla; Kennedy	6:34
Total length:			78:29

Sample credits

- "Bonfire" contains a sample of "Calgary" written by Justin Vernon and Matthew McCaughan and performed by Bon Iver.
- "Pick Up" contains samples of "Neither One of Us (Wants to Be the First to Say Goodbye)" written by James Weatherly and performed by Gladys Knight & the Pips and a sample of "Pick Me Up, I'll Dance" written by Gene McFadden, John Whitehead and Ronald Rose and performed by Melba Moore.

== Charts ==
Chart performance for Knock Knock
Chart (2018)	Peak position
Austrian Albums (Ö3 Austria)	15
Belgian Albums (Ultratop Flanders)	28
Belgian Albums (Ultratop Wallonia)	168
Dutch Albums (Album Top 100)	82
German Albums (Offizielle Top 100)	7
Scottish Albums (OCC)	57
Swiss Albums (Schweizer Hitparade)	18
US Heatseekers Albums (Billboard)	18
