= Sophia Kennedy =

American singer-songwriter (born 1996)

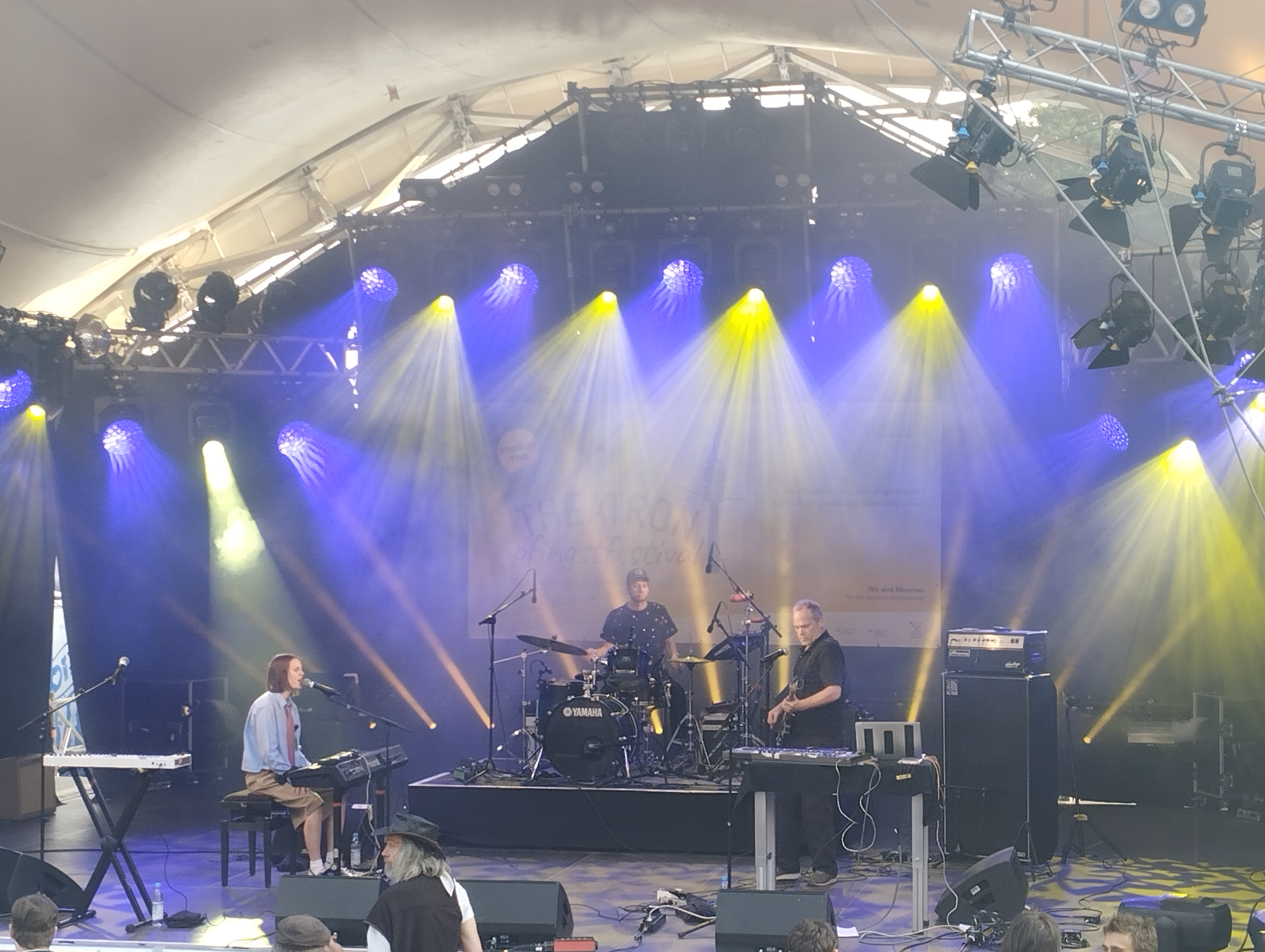
- Sophia Kennedy at the 2025 THEATRON pfingstfestival in Munich
- Born: Sophia Kennedy; January 22, 1996 (age 29); Baltimore, Maryland, U.S.
- Occupations: Singer; songwriter
- Years active: 2016–present
- Musical career
- Genres: Electropop
- Instrument: Vocals
- Labels: City Slang
- Website: www.sophiakennedy.com

Sophia Kennedy is an American singer-songwriter, grown up and living mostly in Germany. Her music style is indie pop and electropop. She is based in Hamburg.

== Early life and education ==
Kennedy was born in Baltimore, Maryland to an American father and mother, who re-married a German. She has two brothers. When she was five years old, the family moved to a village in central Germany near Göttingen. They continued to speak English at home but Kennedy quickly learned German in Kindergarten. She later moved to Hamburg to attend university. Kennedy has said that music brings back her American roots commenting that "I always go there [to Baltimore] in my mind when I'm making music, not to the city in particular, but to the conflict of growing up far away as a kid... I can barely speak English properly anymore – but having that American accent in my voice when I sing, it's the feeling that that's the part of me that's still there."

== Career ==
Kennedy studied filmmaking and began her career making soundtracks for theatre and television before releasing her first album in 2017. It was described in reviews as 'idiosyncratic' and 'like a Dr. Seuss book come to life, but in an even brighter Technicolor. In 2021, she released "Monsters" the songs in which were described as having a unique and varied structure creating an effect which was "disarmingly disorientating and oddly relaxing." She works with Mense Reents, also known as the "Klavierspieler der Goldenen Zitronen" and member of Egoexpress, who accompanies her performances on the stage.
