= Álvaro Díaz (rapper) =

Puerto Rican rapper (born 1989)

- Álvaro Díaz in 2023
- Born: Jorge Álvaro Díaz Rodríguez; June 25, 1989 (age 37); San Juan, Puerto Rico
- Occupations: Rapper; singer; songwriter; record producer
- Years active: 2012–present
- Musical career
- Origin: San Juan, Puerto Rico
- Genres: Latin hip-hop; Latin trap; Reggaeton; Latin pop; R&B
- Instrument: Vocals
- Label: Universal Music Latino
- Website: www.alvarodiaz.com

Jorge Álvaro Díaz Rodríguez (born 1989) is a Puerto Rican rapper and singer.

== Early life and education ==
From the San Juan neighborhood of Hato Rey, Díaz participated in and won rap battles at school, while also sharing his work on popular music forums in Puerto Rico. His love for music was nurtured by his mother, who sang to him throughout his childhood, and his father, who was a member of a salsa orchestra. He discovered hip-hop through Eminem, later influenced by Kanye West and Kid Cudi, which set him apart from Puerto Rico's hip-hop scene. He formed the collective LV CIUDVD with friends to merge indie music and fashion.

Díaz studied public relations at university.

== Career ==
Díaz's breakout single "Chicas de la Isla" was released in 2015, followed by a series of singles. His debut album, Hato Rey (2015), pays homage to his San Juan neighborhood, blending genres like soul, funk, reggaeton, plena, and bomba. The independently released 2016 EP San Juan Grand Prix showcased a grittier, more combative sound. A planned full-length debut album for 2016, initially titled Díaz Buenos, Díaz Malos, never came to fruition. In 2017, Díaz began releasing multiple singles, including club hits like "West Side" and "Asiento de Atrás."

In 2019, Díaz teamed up with Rauw Alejandro for the charting single "Videos" and collaborated with Sousa on the track "Uwi." He also released the three-track EP Díaz Antes: Wavy pa las Bbys and featured on Tainy's electro-cumbia hit "Mera." His 2020 album, Díaz Antes, featured a variety of guest artists, including Yandel and Cazzu, and was preceded by the five-track EP Díaz Antes: La Ciudad de los Niños Tristes.

In 2020, Díaz released the EP Díaz Antes: La Ciudad de los Niños Tristes and followed it with several singles, including "Deportivo" and "Lo Que Te Duele." He also collaborated on tracks by Eladio Carrión ("Mala"), Caleb Calloway ("GT Sport"), and Yatra ("A Dónde Van"). He wrapped up the year with the 17-track Díaz Antes, featuring numerous collaborators such as Yandel, Fuego, and C. Tangana. In early 2021, Díaz contributed to four club hits, including Marconi Impara's "Ouche," Sousa's "Exxxtasy," Llane's "Presente y Futuro" (which also featured Zion), and Kobi Cantillo's "Tarantino" alongside Big Soto.

Díaz released his album Felicilandia in 2021, breaking into the mainstream Latin urbano scene which was inspired by a fictional amusement park representing a euphoric world. His subsequent album, Sayonara, released in 2024, is thematically linked to Felicilandia, exploring the challenges of romance and the process of letting go. It has been described as "darker and much more experimental than its predecessor." Díaz experienced delays with Sayonara, during which he wrote music for artists like Karol G and Daddy Yankee and toured Latin America and Spain. The album Sayonara features contributions and features from several producers and artists such as Feid, Tainy, Quevedo, Mora and Rauw Alejandro. Díaz views the album as a reflection of his personal experiences and struggles, with tracks serving as significant markers in his life, such as him dedicating the track "Golden Gun" to his late manager, Alex Malverde, who supported him early in his career and died in 2021 due to complications arising from COVID-19. Rolling Stone describes Sayonara as evoking the feel of a vintage arcade, filled with colorful neon Eighties sounds, anime references, and heavy synth experiments. The album is noted for its blend of old-school, tambor-heavy reggaeton, early hip-hop, alternative and punk rock, Latin trap, and house.

In July 2024, Díaz performed a Tiny Desk Concert for the video series of live concerts hosted by NPR Music.

Díaz is a member of the Neon16 management roster, which is led by Latin Grammy-winning producer and music executive Lex Borrero.

== Awards and nominations ==
| Award | Year | Recipient(s) and nominee(s) | Category | Result | Ref. |
|---|---|---|---|---|---|
| Latin Grammy Awards | 2022 | Dharma (as featuring) | Album of the Year | Nominated | |
| Latin Grammy Awards | 2024 | Sayonara | Best Urban Music Album | Nominated | |
| Latin Grammy Awards | 2024 | "Byak" (with Rauw Alejandro) | Best Reggaeton Performance | Nominated | |
| Latin Grammy Awards | 2025 | "Xq Eres Así" (with Nathy Peluso) | Best Urban Song | Nominated | |
| Heat Latin Music Awards | 2022 | Himself | Best New Artist | Nominated | |
| Heat Latin Music Awards | 2024 | Himself | Best Artist Northern Region | Nominated | |
| Premios Juventud | 2022 | "Problemón" (with Rauw Alejandro) | Best Social Dance Challenge | Nominated | |
| Premios Juventud | 2023 | Himself | Male Artist – On The Rise | Nominated | |
| Premios Juventud | 2025 | Sayonara: Finales Alternos | Best Urban Album | Nominated | |
| Premios Juventud | 2025 | "Gatitas Sandungueras Vol.1" (with Feid) | Best Urban Mix | Nominated | |
| Premios Lo Nuestro | 2023 | "Problemón" (with Rauw Alejandro) | Urban Collaboration of the Year | Nominated | |
| Premios Tu Música Urbano | 2022 | Himself | Top Male New Artist | Nominated | |
| Premios Tu Música Urbano | 2023 | Himself | Top Male Rising Star | Nominated | |
| Premios Tu Música Urbano | 2025 | Himself | Top Male Rising Star | Won | |
| Premios Tu Música Urbano | 2025 | Himself | Top Indie Artist | Nominated | |
| Premios Tu Música Urbano | 2025 | "Gatitas Sandungueras Vol.1" (with Feid) | Collaboration of the Year | Nominated | |
| Premios Tu Música Urbano | 2025 | "Xq Eres Así" (with Nathy Peluso) | Top Indie Song | Nominated | |
| Premios Tu Música Urbano | 2025 | Sayonara | Album of the Year - Male | Nominated | |
| Rolling Stone en Español Awards | 2023 | Himself | Voice of the Audience | Nominated | |
| Rolling Stone en Español Awards | 2026 | Himself | Artist of the Year | Pending | |
| Rolling Stone en Español Awards | 2026 | Himself | Alternative Proposal of the Year | Pending | |
| Rolling Stone en Español Awards | 2026 | Himself | Best Urban Music Project | Pending | |
| Rolling Stone en Español Awards | 2026 | Omakase | Album of the Year | Pending | |
| Rolling Stone en Español Awards | 2026 | "Perdiste el Emmy" (with Tainy) | Collaboration of the Year | Pending | |

== Discography ==
=== Albums and EPs ===
- Hato Rey (2015)
- San Juan Grand Prix (EP) (2016)
- Díaz Antes: La Ciudad de los Niños Tristes (EP) (2019)
- Díaz Antes (2020)
- Felicilandia (2021)
- Sayonara (2024)
- Sayonara: Finales Alternos (2024)
- Omakase (2026)

=== Singles ===
- "West Side" (2017)
- "Asiento de Atrás" (2017)
- "Paranoia" (2025)
