= Xochimilco Ecological Park and Plant Market =

Park and market in Xochimilco, Mexico City, Mexico

Coordinates: 19°16′59.21″N 99°5′46.81″W

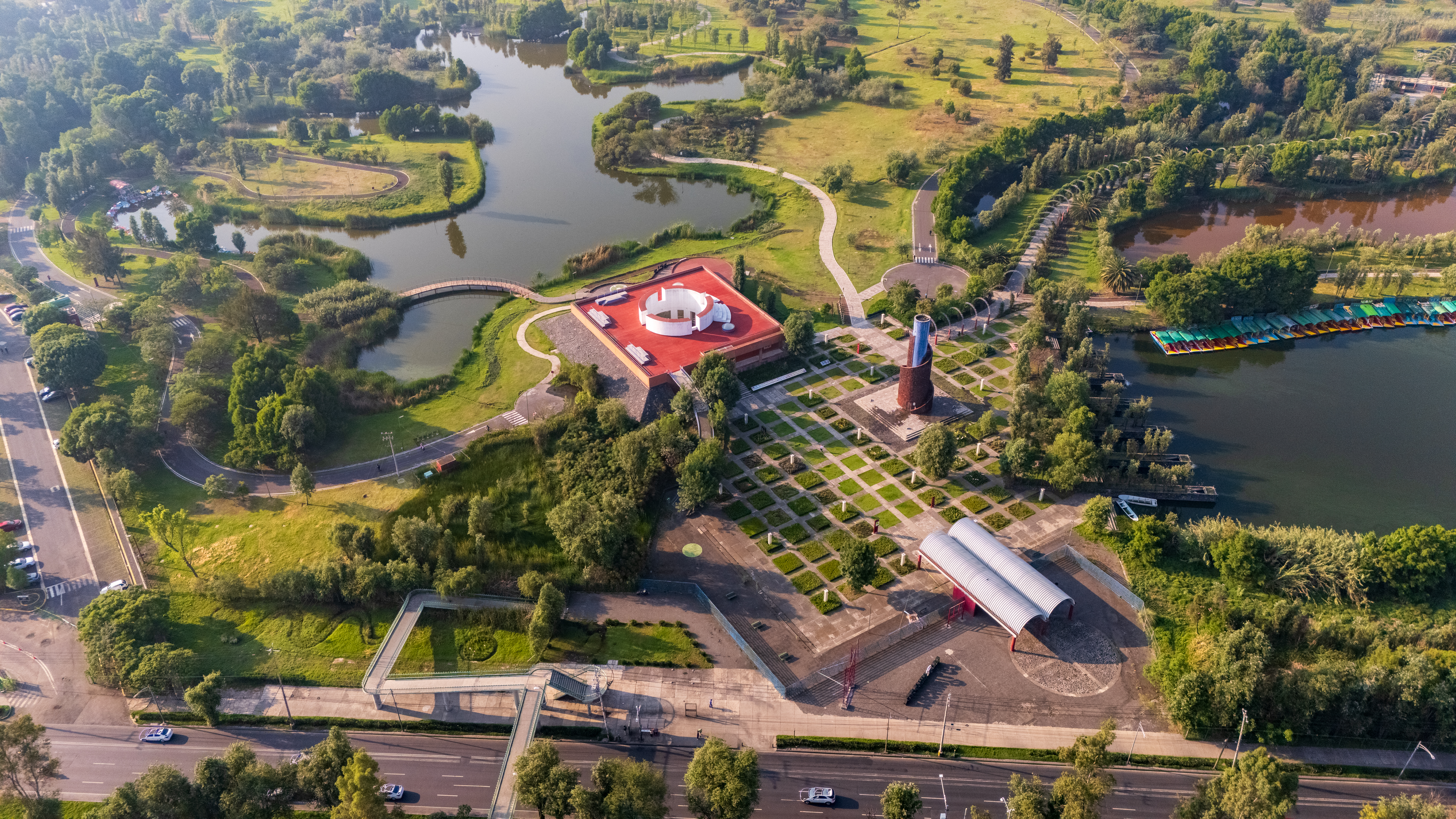
Aerial view of Xochimilco Ecological Park.

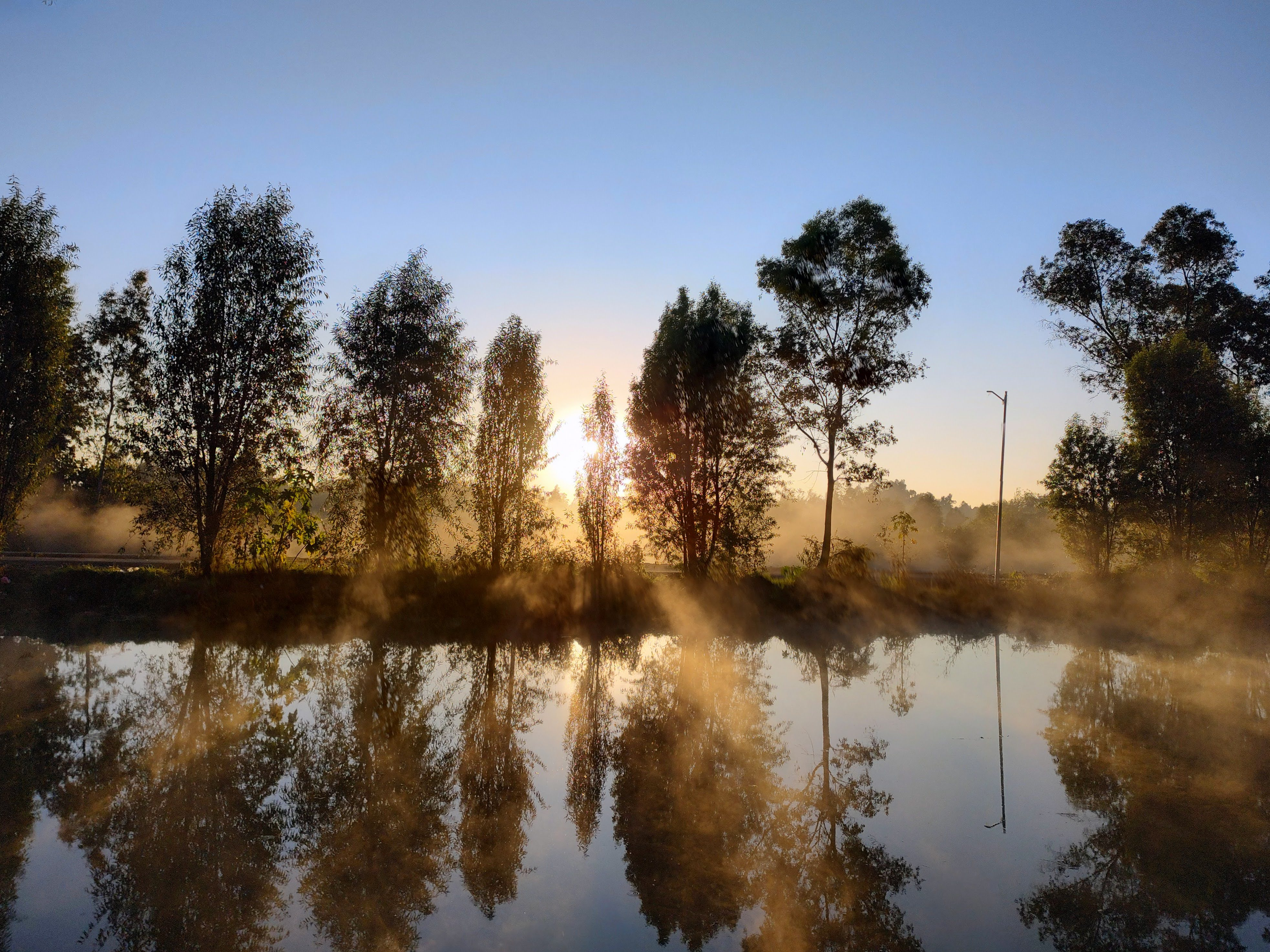
View from one of the canals in the park

Xochimilco Ecological Park and Plant Market is a natural reserve or park, with a 13-hectare (32-acre) plant market, the largest in Latin America. The park and market are located in the southern Mexico City borough of Xochimilco, about 23 km south of the historic center of the city. The park was designed by Mario Schjetnan. The park was inaugurated in 1993, on chinampas (artificial lake islands) which had been previously declared as part of a World Heritage Site. However, the area's ecology was badly degraded, and the park was established in order to revitalize and preserve the ecosystem. Success has been mixed. While much of the wetlands have been recharged, pollution and illegal settlements in the area remain as threats. As the park needs to be self-sustaining economically, there are a number of ways that the park raises money. One of the best known of these is the Xochimilco or Cuemanco Plant Market, which rents stalls to ornamental plant producers/sellers near the main entrance of the park.

== Description of the park ==
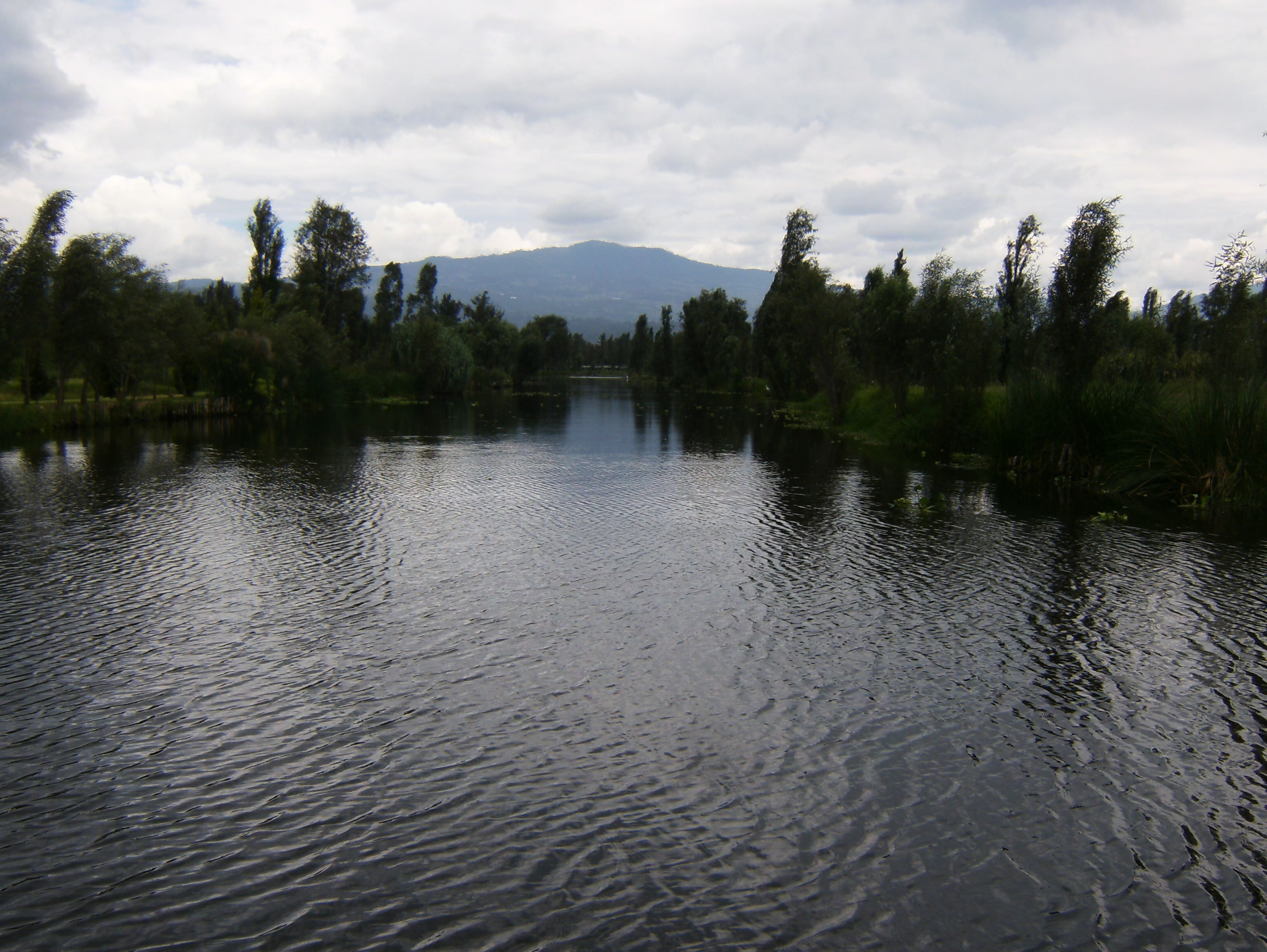
View of the main lake at the Xochimilco Ecological Park.

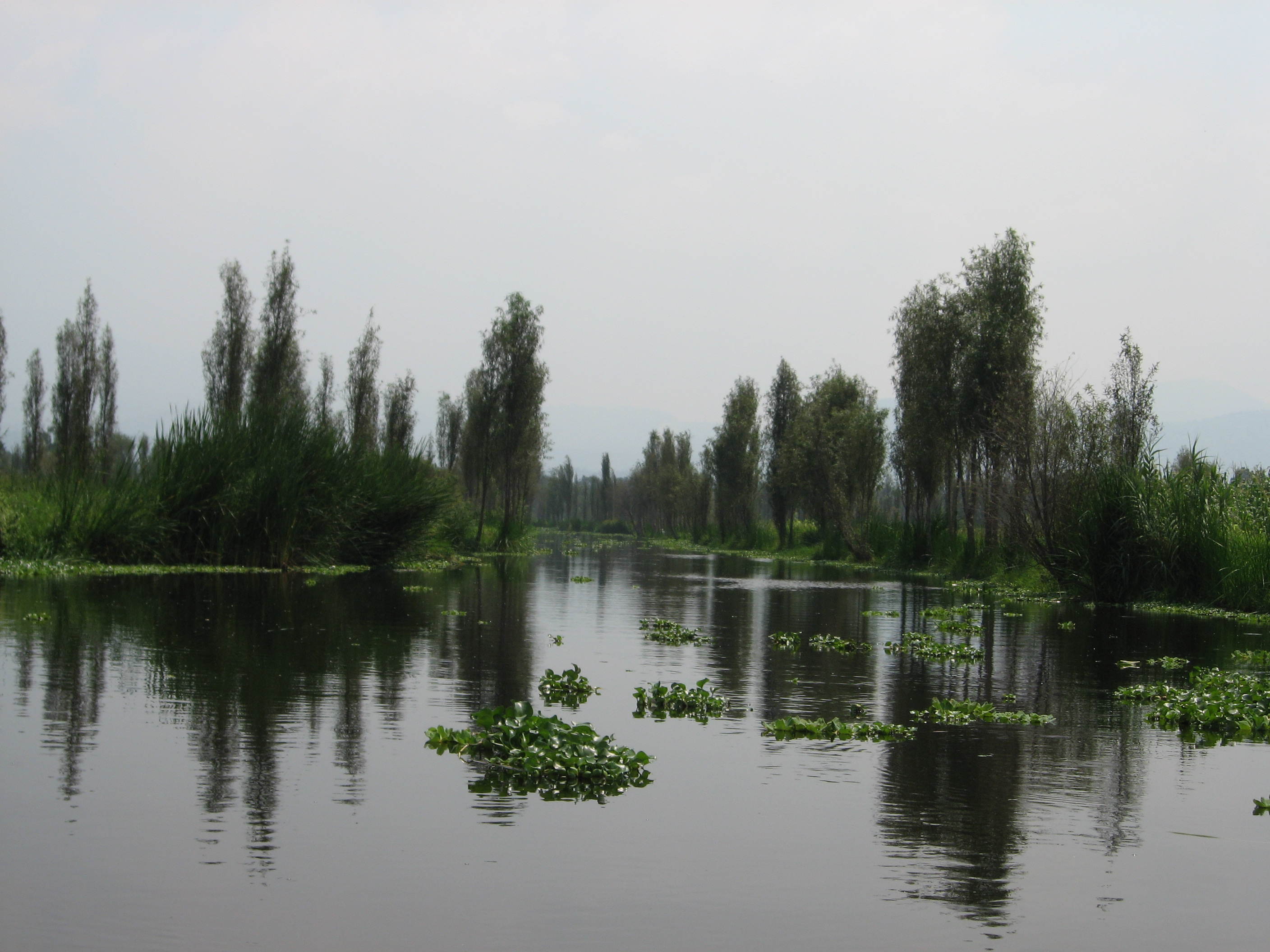
Canal with chinampas on both sides

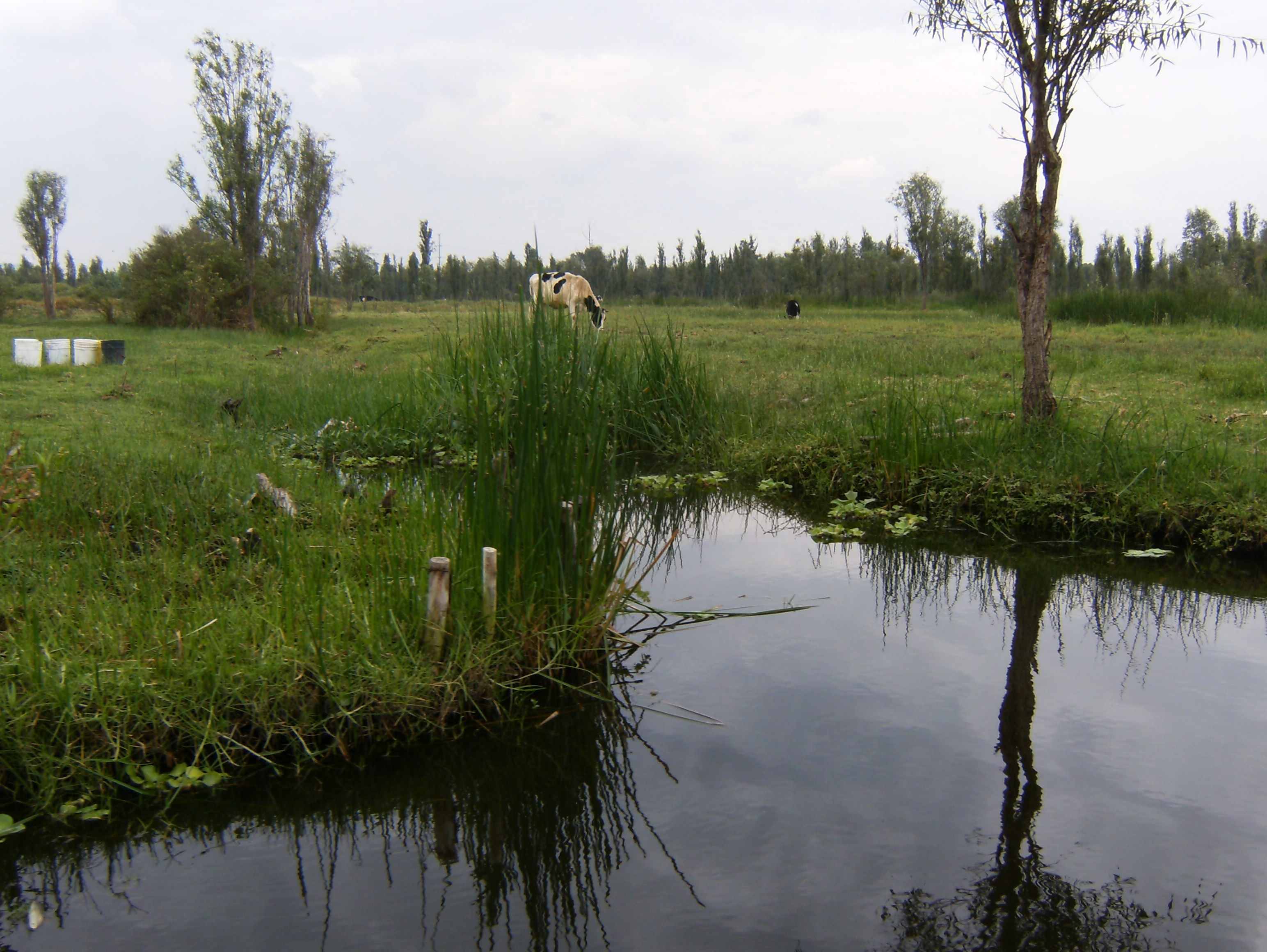
Cows grazing on chinampas in the park

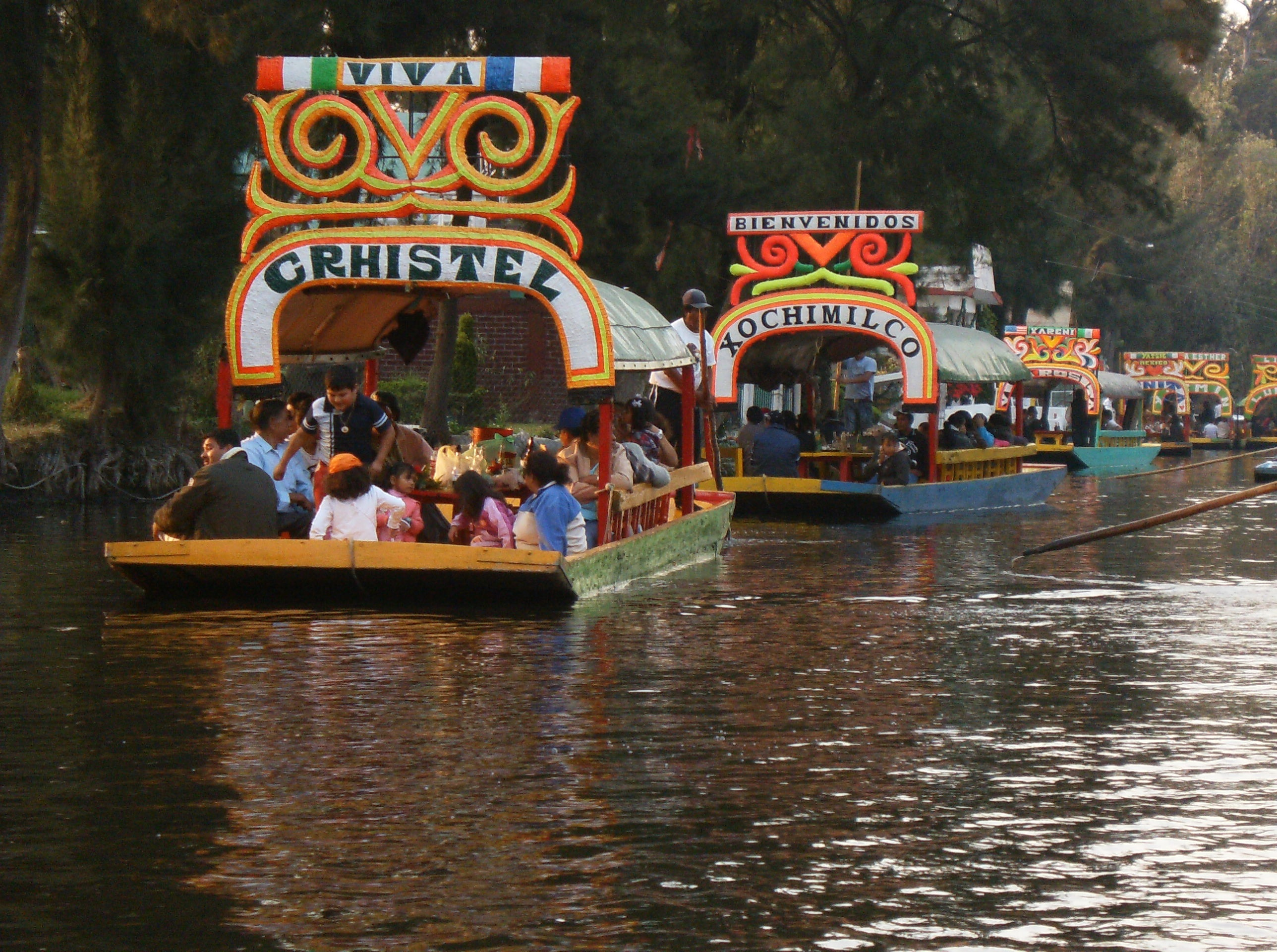
Boats called "trajineras" in a canal

The park extends over approximately 215 hectares (0.83 mi^{2}) in the borough of Xochimilco, 23 km south of the historic center of Mexico City, between Periférico Oriente and Periférico Sur, near the Cuemanco area. The official address is Anillo Periférico #1, Colonia Ciénega Grande, Xochimilco, 16036 Mexico City, CDMX. This area of Xochimilco is known as Cuemanco, so the park and market are also sometimes referred to with this name. The population around the area is a mix of urban, semi-urban and rural settlements. No one is permitted to live in the park. It is the largest park in Mexico City after Chapultepec, and is considered to be one of the "lungs" of Mexico City. The park is divided by the Anillo Periférico, with the section north of the road smaller than the southern section.

The park has agreements with the public schools and receives 150,000 school children each year.

Much of the park's territory is dedicated to chinampas. Chinampas are artificial islands created on the shallow waters of the lakes starting in the pre-Hispanic period. These islands began as rafts made with tree branches and other materials, which were then loaded with soil and mud from the lake bottom and tied to ahuejote or other kinds of trees to anchor them. Over time, these rafts would sink and pile up on the shallow lake bottom, eventually becoming fixed islands. As these islands multiplied in number, they became separated by canals, which are necessary to keep a constant supply of water to the chinampa. The canals of the parks were created by this method. In the past, chinampas were primarily used for the growing of foodstuffs, but today, most of what is raised is ornamental plants. Much of the ecological system was restored over a five-year period, then the area opened as a park in 1993 in order to create tourism, hinder the urbanization of the area and preserve the local ecology. Most of the park's area is an aquatic environment of lakes, canals or chinampas with some forested areas, much of which are planted with ahuejotes, pines and eucalyptus. Most of these chinampas have been transformed into "agro-ecological" land, meaning it is an ecological preserve and farmland at the same time. This area extends from Cuemanco to Mixquic in the Tláhuac borough, all connected by a series of canals. These are what made Xochimilco a World Heritage Site. The aim of this area is to preserve an environment known to the Aztecs over 500 years ago.

In addition to the chinampas, restoration efforts expanded a lake to 54 hectares and created two smaller artificial ones of about a hectare each. Facing these waterways is the Cuemanco embarcadero (docks) from which trajinera boats depart, near the best-preserved chinampas in Xochimilco. Trajineras are flat-bottomed barges similar to gondolas. These were used in the past to move merchandise around the vast lake and canal system of the Valley of Mexico. Today, most are used for tourism. Tourist trajineras have been somewhat modified from ancient ones with the addition of a roof for shade, tables and chairs for picnicking and a large brightly decorated arch, often with a woman's name over top. In October and November, for Day of the Dead, the Cuemanco embarcadero hosts a play about La Llorona, a spectre said to roam parts of Mexico at night looking for her children. The play is called Cihuacóatl, Leyenda de la Llorona. This version of the story is based on an old goddess of the area called Cihuacóatl, whose story is similar to the current folk tale. Spectators are taken from the embarcadero to the Tlilac Lake on trajineras along canals with light and sound effects. The play takes place on a chinampa in the lake. These boats, along with the associated plant market, are the best-known features of the park.

The park is divided into four areas: recreational, the Xochilta Garden, the bird sanctuary, and the botanical garden. The park has a number of other attractions. There are two greenhouses, bicycle and jogging paths, the Cuemanco canal for rowing, a small zoo, an aviary managed by SEDESOL, an area with archeological artifacts, enclosures for deer and coyotes in rehabilitation, playgrounds, 35 fields and courts for sports and areas for picnicking with palapas. The park's information center has displays related to the flora and fauna of the area. Although the park is owned by the city, it is managed by a private civil association called the Patronato del Parque Ecológico de Xochimilco Asociación Civil, with the aim of making the park self-sustaining economically. There is an entrance fee of twenty pesos, and bicycles, ATVs and boats available to rent. The plant market is also part of this, as stalls are rented out to sellers.

One of the park's functions is to provide shelter for wildlife. The most iconic species to Xochimilco is the axolotl, a salamander species considered to be an incarnation of a god by the Aztecs because of its ability to regrow certain body parts. This animal is highly endangered and is no longer found wild in the canals of Xochimilco. It is kept from extinction through the efforts of organizations such as Umbral Axochiatl, which works in conjunction with the Instituto de Biología de la Universidad Nacional Autónoma de México (UNAM). These have facilities at the park. Other research facilities include a meteorology station and a laboratory to test the soil and water.

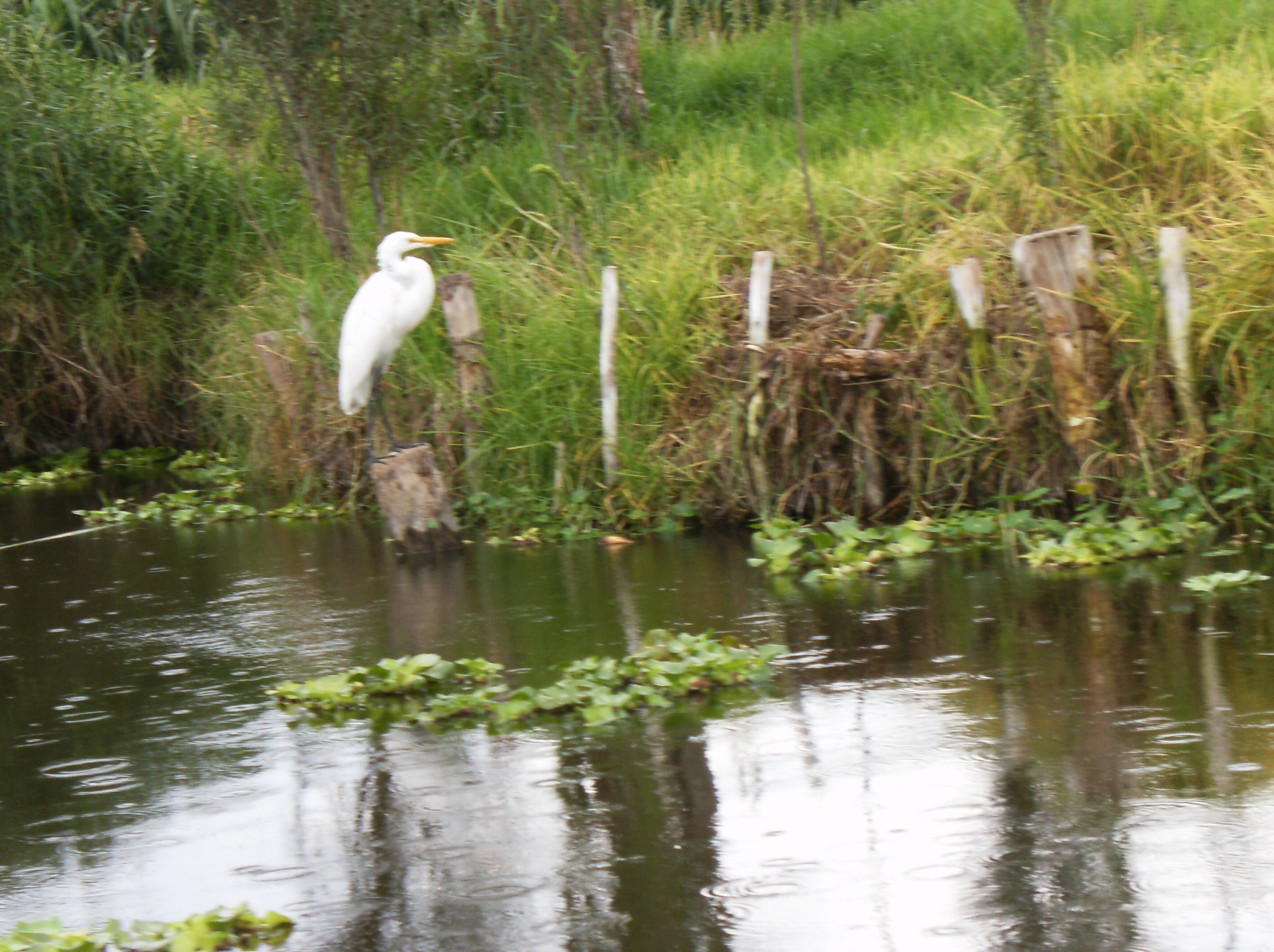
Wading egret in the park

More successful has been the preservation of areas to host bird species, both those that live in the area year-round and those who migrate here in the winter. Many are seen on the large lake, called Huetzalen. The waters contain reeds, another plant called chacatules, often used in crafts, aquatic birds, insects and fish. The area is very quiet, especially compared to the urban area which nearly surrounds it. Migratory birds can be seen in the area starting in October, but the best time to see them is between December and April. Registered birds include sparrows, grackles, storks, hummingbirds, eagles, herons, moorhens and egrets. There are 15 species of ducks both native and migratory.

Another migratory bird seen in the winter is the great egret, which grows to up to a meter in height. Some rare birds that have been seen here include the common kestrel, the osprey and certain types of owl. The most commonly observed migratory species is the American white pelican, which was not seen in the area before the lake and canals were restored. However, this species has only been seen in numbers since the 2000s, with 500 reported as of 2009. These birds migrate here from Canada and the northern US. Another important species is the kingfisher, which was earlier thought to be extinct in the area, but has been seen again.

One drawback of the park is its lack of mature shade trees, as they were planted when the park was founded in the 1990s. The park's ecology remains in danger from pollution associated with urban sprawl. The water is contaminated by sewage and household garbage, damaging flora, driving away wildlife and risking the health of surrounding residents.

== The Cuemanco Plant Market ==
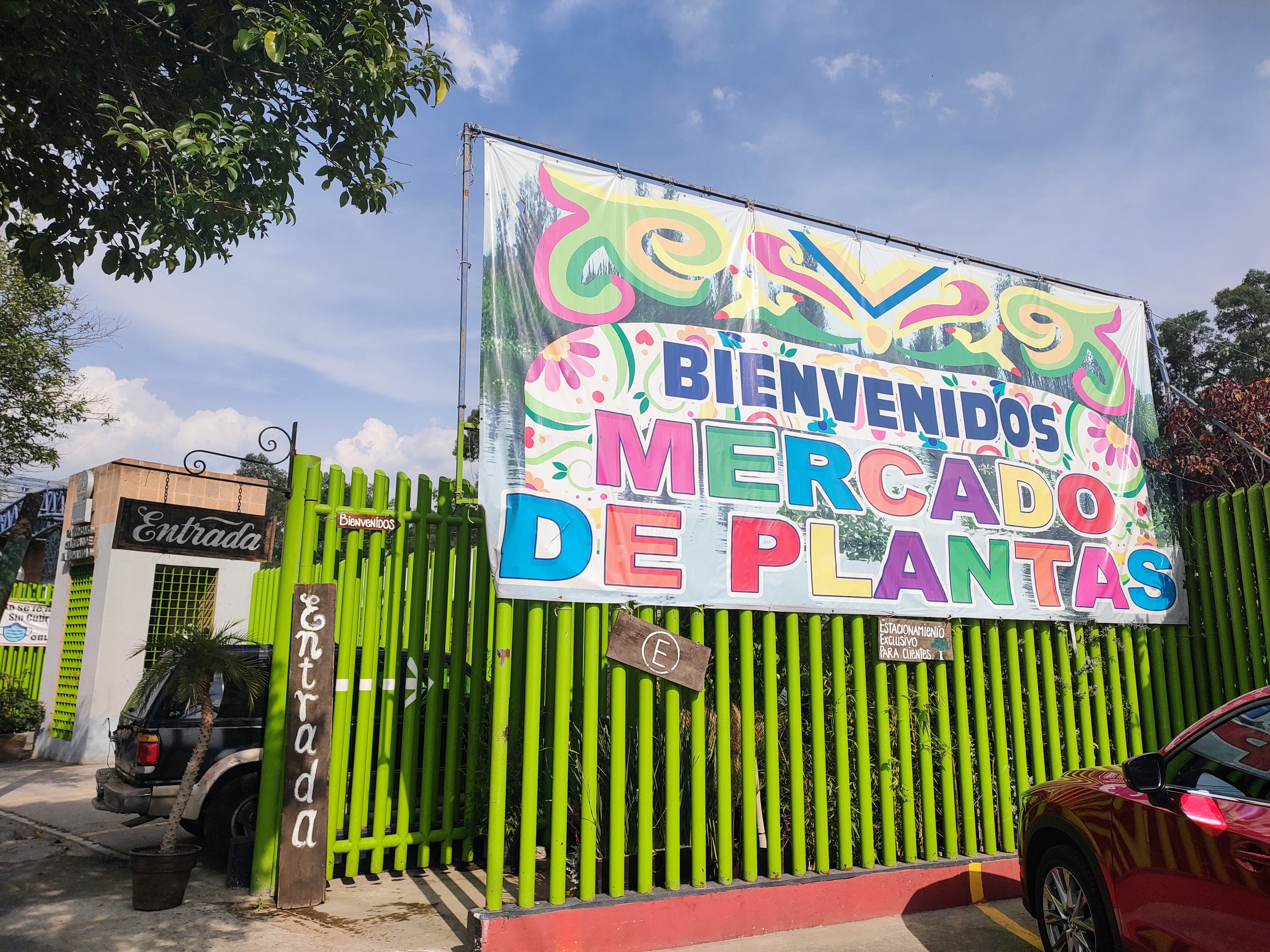
Plant Market

The Xochimilco Plant Market, also called the Cuemanco Market, sits on an extension of 13 hectares of park land near the main entrance on Canal Nacional, where it crosses the Anillo Períferico Oriente. This live plant market and warehouse is the largest of its type in Latin America. It is the main moneymaking operation of the ecological park, renting out 1,700 stalls to sellers of live plants and related items, much the same way as Mexican traditional markets. Most of the sellers are producers. However, only about 600 stalls are active selling points, the rest are empty or used for storage.

The most important related products made and sold at the market are flowerpots and vases. As the growing of ornamental plants is a relatively new phenomenon for Xochimilco, so is the making of these wares. Many craftsmen taught themselves how to create them. Most are made from traditional ceramics, but some are made with other materials, including recycled ones. Most are made by the sellers themselves and painted in bright colors and/or decorated with pebbles, crystals and other items.

In addition to the plant-vending areas, there is a cactus garden and areas with restaurants. The market has at least seven stands that serve beer without the necessary permits and have been accused of selling to underage students from the three universities and prepas near the area – UAM Xochimilco, ITESM-CCM and Colegio de Bachilleres#4. A number attract student patrons by playing popular music on large loudspeakers. These stands are particularly popular with students on Fridays.

Although the installation of the market and other moneymaking operations have proven to be successful, this plant market did have financial and operating difficulties in 2001. The financial difficulties were associated with losses in the funds destined for improvements and repairs. One reason for this was that many of the stalls had not yet been rented. Another problem was ongoing disputes between plant sellers and the then manager of the market, which required intervention by borough authorities. This market is the largest in Xochimilco but there are several others in the borough also dedicated to plants. These include Madreselva in the Bosque de Nativitas, Mercado Xochimilco, the Palacio de la Flor and the historic market of the San Luis Tlaxialtemalco community.

== History ==
Much of the area of the park has been chinampa land since the pre-Hispanic period. Xochimilco is one of few areas left in the Valley of Mexico that still has a significant number of chinampas. The area was declared a biological reserve by the Mexican government in 1984 and a World Heritage Site in 1987 by UNESCO.

Until 1988, the park land had been privately owned. However, the area had been severely degraded with lakes and canals going dry and the salinity and pollution of the remaining water making farming nearly impossible. The pollution was primarily coming from the Buenaventura River, with carried with it dirty water from other rivers in the south of the city. By the 1980s, these chinampa farmers had been prohibited from growing any edible plants on their lands.

The city and federal governments conceived and began to implement a plan to save Mexico City's remaining chinampas called the Xochimilco Ecological Rescue Plan (Plan de Rescate Ecológico de Xochimilco), the center of which was the establishment of the park. The goal the project is to restore the chinampa ecosystem here to what it was during the Aztec Empire and then preserve it that way. The area was recharged with treated water to reinvigorate and create much of the surface water that is there today. Native vegetation was brought in by biologists and botanists. To restore soils, much of the sanitary debris from the 1985 earthquake and soils dug from the building of the Metro was brought in.

After five years of work, the park was opened to the public in 1993. Eight years after its establishment, it already had 240,000 trees and 500,000 other kinds of plants over 210 hectares. However, expropriation of the land was fought by the chinampa owners for years after it occurred. The most problematic time for the park was in 2001, eight years after its opening. Despite major investments and efforts into restoration, there were still very serious contamination problems and a number of ejido lands that had been appropriated in the 1980s were given back to owners by the courts. The setback caused a number of local organizations to denounce the project as a failure and demand that then Mexico City mayor Andrés Manuel López Obrador investigate.

Since then, the park has managed to survive and be self-sustaining. However, serious environmental problems continue to plague that park and the rest of chinampa lands in Xochimilco. Pollution of the waters in the lakes and canals continue to be serious, as sewage and household garbage finds its way into the water. However, the most pressing problem is invasions of chinampa land by illegal settlements. In 2004 and 2007, families who had been swindled into illegally buying lands in the park lost their homes as they were evicted. Many people living illegally on the land have organized to put political pressure on authorities to let them remain, with mixed success. The fact that there are still illegal settlements in the park, which is land designated as a World Heritage Site, has put the borough at odds with UNESCO. UNESCO wants all illegal settlements out in order to preserve the site's status, but borough officials claim this would not be feasible.
