= DJ Koze =

German DJ and music producer (born 1972)

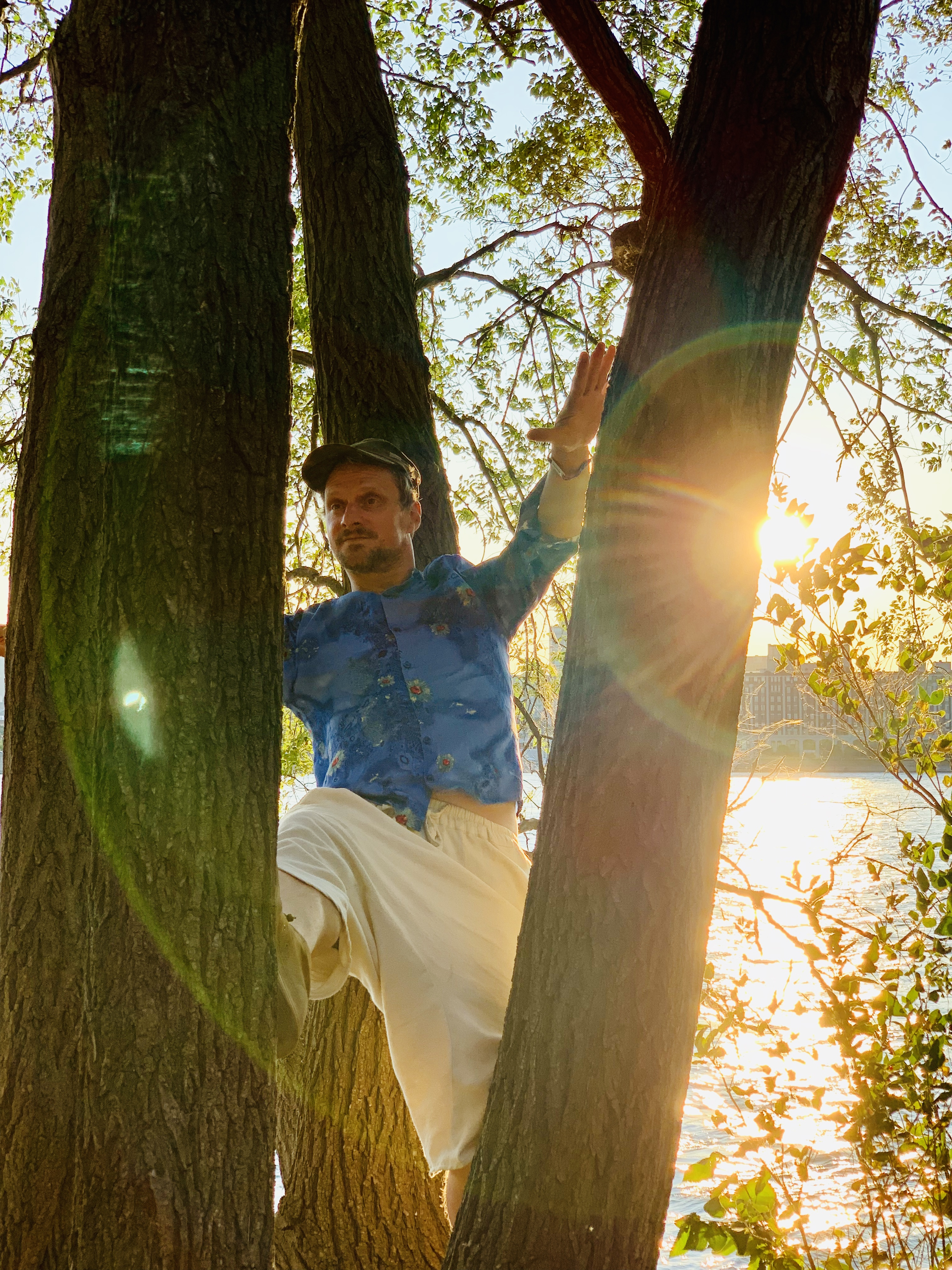
- DJ Koze in 2019

Background information
- Born: Stefan Kozalla; 1972 (age 53–54); Flensburg, Schleswig-Holstein, West Germany
- Origin: Hamburg, Germany
- Genres: Techno; house; tech house; minimal techno; deep house; microhouse; alternative hip hop
- Occupations: DJ; record producer; rapper (formerly)
- Years active: 1988–present
- Label: Pampa Records
- Formerly of: International Pony
- Website: pamparecords.com

Stefan Kozalla (born 1972), better known as DJ Koze (German pronunciation: [ˈkɔtsə]), is a German DJ and music producer.

== Biography ==
Kozalla was born in Flensburg, Schleswig-Holstein, and became fascinated with synthesizer-based acts such as Depeche Mode and Orchestral Manoeuvres in the Dark during his youth. He first gained recognition within the Hamburg music scene. In the early 1990s, he functioned as a rapper and DJ for various hip-hop groups in Flensburg. In 1991, DJ Koze reached second place in the German DMC Championship (an offshoot of the Disco Mix Club). Two years later, he moved to Hamburg and, together with Cosmic DJ, DJ Stachy, and the "Schreckliche Sven", founded the hip hop formation Fischmob, which persisted for about five years.

At the same time, he also worked with electronic music, increasing his name recognition as a DJ and producing remixes, sometimes under the pseudonym Adolf Noise. A collection of such remixes appeared in 2000 under the title Music Is Okay. As Adolf Noise in 2001, with Max Goldt as spokesman, he released the single "Deine Reime sind Schweine", a satire on battle rap tracks in German hip hop.

Together with Cosmic DJ and Erobique he founded the project International Pony, releasing We Love Music in 2002 Mit Dir sind wir vier in 2006. Since 2003, Koze published several Techno-Maxis at the Cologne label Kompakt under the name Monaco Schranze (a corruption of Monaco Franze and Schranz). He also released his second mix CD in 2004, titled All People Is My Friends.

As a DJ, he also performed at major festivals such as Coachella, Osheaga, Outside Lands, Roskilde, Sónar, Tomorrowland, SonneMondSterne, Melt!, Time Warp, Mayday, Mutek, Amsterdam Dance Event, Snowbombing, Nature One, Fusion Festival and Meredith Music Festival. In reader surveys of the music magazines Spex, Intro and de: Bug he was repeatedly voted DJ of the Year.

His productions under the name Adolf Noise are generally more experimental and eccentric. After Wunden, s. Beine Offen in April 2005, the second Adolf Noise album Wo die Rammelwolle fliegt was released.

He has run the label Pampa Records since 2009. On that label, he released the album Amygdala in 2013, entering the official German and Swiss charts for the first time. In addition, he received the Critics Award at the 2014 Echo Awards ceremony. On June 15, 2015, his edition of the mix series DJ Kicks was released on the Berlin label Studio !K7, which attracted a great deal of national and international attention. In 2017, he was nominated for two Electronic Music Awards for Record of the Year and Remix of the Year, both for his Extended Disco Version of Låpsley's "Operator".

In January 2018, DJ Koze announced his fourth studio album titled Knock Knock, which was released on May 4, 2018 on Pampa Records. On July 12, 2018, his remix of the track "Humility" by British band Gorillaz was released.

On October 19, 2018, he was awarded the Prize for Pop Culture in the Favorite Producer category at the Tempodrom Berlin.

DJ Koze performed at the Sydney Opera House Concert Hall for the first time on 12 December 2019 and also debuted his new A/V show, Popup Jungle.

Róisín Murphy announced in March 2023 her signing to Ninja Tune with a new single, "CooCool", which was produced by DJ Koze. Her album Hit Parade, produced by DJ Koze, was released on 8 September 2023 on Ninja Tune and reached #6 on the official German albums chart and #5 on the official UK albums chart in its week of release.

On November 29, 2024, DJ Koze announced the release of his fifth studio album titled Music Can Hear Us, a release on his own label, Pampa Records. On the same day, the first single from the album, "Pure Love", a song created in collaboration with Damon Albarn, was released.

Kozalla himself pronounces his DJ name as (German pronunciation: [ˈkɔtsə]) which, in German, is identical to kotze ("puke, vomit"). Internationally, his name is pronounced like cozy (/ˈkoʊzi/) in (American) English.

== Awards ==
Echo Pop

- 2014: Critics' choice award (Amygdala)

DJ Awards

- 2018: Category „Electronica/Downtempo“ (DJ Koze)

Faze Magazine

- 2023: 1st Place Producer of the Year

Groove Magazine

- 2023: 4th Place DJ of the Year
- 2024: 1st Place Producer of the Year
- 2024: 2nd Place Track of the Year

Preis für Popkultur

- 2018: Category „favourite producer“ (Knock Knock)

Pitchfork - The 50 Best Albums of 2018

- 2018: 3rd Place - Knock Knock

Pitchfork - The 100 Best Songs of 2018

- 2018: 5th Place - Pick Up

MIXMAG - The Top 50 Tracks of 2018

- 2018: 1st Place - Pick Up

Noisey - The 100 Best Albums of 2018

- 2018: 9th Place - Knock Knock

Resident Advisor - 2018's Best Tracks

- 2018: Pick Up

Rolling Stone - 50 Best Albums of 2018 So Far

- 2018: Knock Knock

FM4 - Most Wanted - 100 besten Clubtracks des Jahres

- 2018: 1st Place - Pick Up

== Discography ==
Studio albums

- 2005: Kosi Comes Around (Kompakt Records)
- 2013: Amygdala (Pampa Records)
- 2018: Knock Knock (Pampa Records)
- 2025: Music Can Hear Us (Pampa Records)

Singles and EPs

- 1998: Happy Hip Hop (Yo Mama)
- 2001: Deine Reime Sind Schweine (Regelrechte Schweine) (Buback)
- 2003: The Geklöppel Continues (Kompakt Records)
- 2004: Late Check Out (Kompakt Records)
- 2004: Speicher 20 (Kompakt Extra)
- 2005: Lighta Spuba (Freude am Tanzen)
- 2006: Kosi Comes Around – Remixes Part 1 (Kompakt Records)
- 2006: Stompin at the Clubfoot (Kompakt Records)
- 2007: All the Time (Philpot)
- 2007: Naked (Cereal/Killers)
- 2008: I Want to Sleep (International Records Recordings)
- 2009: Mrs. Bojangels (Circus Company)
- 2010: Rue Burnout / Blume der Nacht (Pampa Records)
- 2012: My Orphaned Son / It’s Only (Pampa Records)
- 2013: Amygdala Remixes #1 (Pampa Records)
- 2014: Amygdala Remixes #2 (Pampa Records)
- 2014: La Duquesa / Burn With Me (Pampa Records)
- 2015: XTC (Pampa Records)
- 2016: Driven (Hart&Tief)
- 2018: Seeing Aliens (Pampa Records)
- 2018: Pick Up (Pampa Records)
- 2021: Record Store Day 2021 Exclusive (Pampa Records)
- 2022: knock knock Remixes #1 (Pampa Records)
- 2022: knock knock Remixes #2 (Pampa Records)
- 2023: Róisín Murphy & DJ Koze – Can’t Replicate 12″ Edit (Ninja Tune)
- 2023: Wespennest/Candidasa EP (Pampa Records)
- 2024: Gerry Read x DJ Koze - Highly Recommended (8 Head Records)
- 2024: DJ Koze feat. Arnim Teutoburg-Weiß & The Düsseldorf Düsterboys – Wie schön du bist (Pampa Records)
- 2024: DJ Koze feat. Damon Albarn – Pure Love (Pampa Records)
- 2025: DJ Koze feat. Ada - Unbelievable (Pampa Records)
- 2026: DJ Koze - Spiralen EP (Pampa Records)
- 2026: Paul Valentin - Elvau feat. Liv Lisa Fries (DJ Koze Remix) (Feines Tier)

Compilations

- 2000: Music Is Okay (Yo Mama)
- 2009: Reincarnations: The Remix Chapter 2001-2009 (Get Physical Music)
- 2014: Reincarnations Part 2: The Remix Chapter 2009-2014 (Pampa Records)

DJ mixsets

- 2004: All People Is My Friends
- 2009: Resident Advisor #145
- 2013: FACT 387
- 2013: XLR8R 324
- 2015: DJ-Kicks: DJ Koze (DJ-Kicks Vol. 50)

Remixes

- Herbert – It’s Only (DJ Koze Remix)
- Moderat – Bad Kingdom (DJ Koze Remix)
- Mount Kimbie – Made to Stray (DJ Koze Remix)
- Malaria! vs. Chicks On Speed – Kaltes Klares Wasser (DJ Koze Remix)
- Blumfeld – Tausend Tränen Tief (Loverboy Mix)
- Fettes Brot – Silberfische In Meinem Bett (Adolf Noise Meets Fettes Blut)
- Die Goldenen Zitronen – Weil Wir Einverstanden Sind (DJ Koze a.k.a. Adolf Noise Remix)
- Egoexpress – Telefunken (DJ Koze Remix)
- Rocko Schamoni – The Diskoteer (DJ Koze Remix)
- Die Fantastischen Vier – Le Smou (DJ Koze & Mario Von Hacht Rmx)
- Reinhard Voigt – Zu Dicht Dran (DJ Koze Remix)
- Hildegard Knef – Ich Liebe Euch (DJ Koze Remix)
- Andreas Dorau – Kein Liebeslied (DJ Koze Remix)
- Ada – Eve (DJ Koze Remix)
- Ada – Faith (DJ Koze Remix)
- Heiko Voss – I Think About You (DJ Koze Mix)
- Mano Le Tough – Energy Flow (DJ Koze Remixes)
- James Figurine – Apologies (DJ Koze Rmx)
- Wassermann – Die Schallplatte (DJ Koze Remix)
- Meloboy – Hot Love (DJ Koze Mix)
- Wechsel Garland – Mutes (DJ Koze’s Broken CD-Mix)
- Blagger – Strange Behavior (DJ Koze AKA Swhaimi Remix)
- Alter Ego – Jolly Joker (DJ Koze’s Nuttich Styler Remix)
- Battles – Atlas (DJ Koze Remix)
- Gerd – 1 In the Morning (At The club) (DJ Koze Remix)
- Sascha Funke – Mango Cookie (DJ Koze Remix)
- Mathias Kaden – Kawaba (DJ Koze’s Kosi-San Remix)
- Nôze – Danse Avec Moi (DJ Koze Rework)
- Matthew Dear – Elementary Lover (Dj Koze Rmx)
- Lawrence – Rabbit Tube (DJ Koze Remix)
- Låpsley – Operator (DJ Koze Remix)
- Caribou – Found Out (DJ Koze Remix)
- Caribou – Jamelia (DJ Koze Remix)
- The Big Crunch Theory – Distortion (DJ Koze Remix)
- Who Made Who – Keep Me In My Plane (DJ Koze Hudson River Dub)
- Makossa & Megablast feat. Cleydys Villalon – Soy Como Soy (DJ Koze No Voy A Cambiar Repaso)
- Efdemin – There Will Be Singing (DJ Koze Remix)
- Michael Mayer & Joe Goddard – For You (DJ Koze Remixes)
- Chilly Gonzales – Knight Moves (DJ Koze Remix)
- Apparat – Black Water (DJ Koze Remix)
- Superflu – Jo Gurt (Dj Koze RMX)
- 2raumwohnung – Somebody Lonely and Me (Remixes)
- Matias Aguayo – Minimal (DJ Koze Remix)
- Underworld – I Exhale (DJ Koze Remix)
- Roman Flügel – 9 Years (DJ Koze Remix)
- Radio Slave – Reverse (DJ Koze Edit)
- Gorillaz – Humility (DJ Koze Remix)
- Radio Slave – Reverse (DJ Koze Edit)
- Gerry Read – It’ll All Be Over (DJ Koze remix)
- Sebjak & Fahlberg – 4Ever She May Live (DJ Koze Edit)
- Lakou Mizik & Joseph Ray – Sanba Yo Pran Pale (DJ Koze Remix)
- José González – Tjomme (DJ Koze Remix)
- Solomun feat. Jamie Foxx – Ocean (DJ Koze Remix)
- Peggy Gou – I Go (DJ Koze Remix)
- Melle Brown feat. Annie Mac – Feel About You (DJ Koze Remix)
- Dumbo Tracks & Markus Acher – Everybody Knows (DJ Koze Remix)
- Róisín Murphy & DJ Koze – Can’t Replicate 12″ Edit

With Adolf Noise

- 1996: Wunden, S. Beine Offen
- 2001: Deine Reime Sind Schweine (Regelrechte Schweine)
- 2005: Wo die Rammelwolle fliegt

With Fischmob

- 1995: Männer können seine Gefühle nicht zeigen
- 1998: Power

With Monaco Schranze

- 2003: Speicher 11 (with Naum)
- 2004: Speicher 25 (with Gebr. Teichmann)

With Marteria

- 2021: 5. Dimension (album producer and co-writer)

With Róisín Murphy

- 2023: Hit Parade (album producer and co-writer)
- 2024: Hit Parade Remixes
