= Mint Field =

Mint Field is a Mexican shoegaze trio from Playas de Tijuana, Mexico. The group consists of vocalist and guitarist Estrella Sanchez, bassist Sebastian Neyra and drummer Callum Brown.

== History ==
Mint Field released their first EP in 2015, titled Primeras Salidas. This led to them being booked for the 2015 edition of Coachella. The trio released their first full-length album in 2018, titled Pasar de Las Luces. In 2020, the trio followed up that release with their second full-length album, Sentimiento Mundial, which was released on September 25. The album received positive reviews. The group released their third album, Aprender a Ser, in October 2023.
