= San Bernardino de Siena Church, Xochimilco =

Coordinates: 19°15′47.46″N 99°6′7.13″W

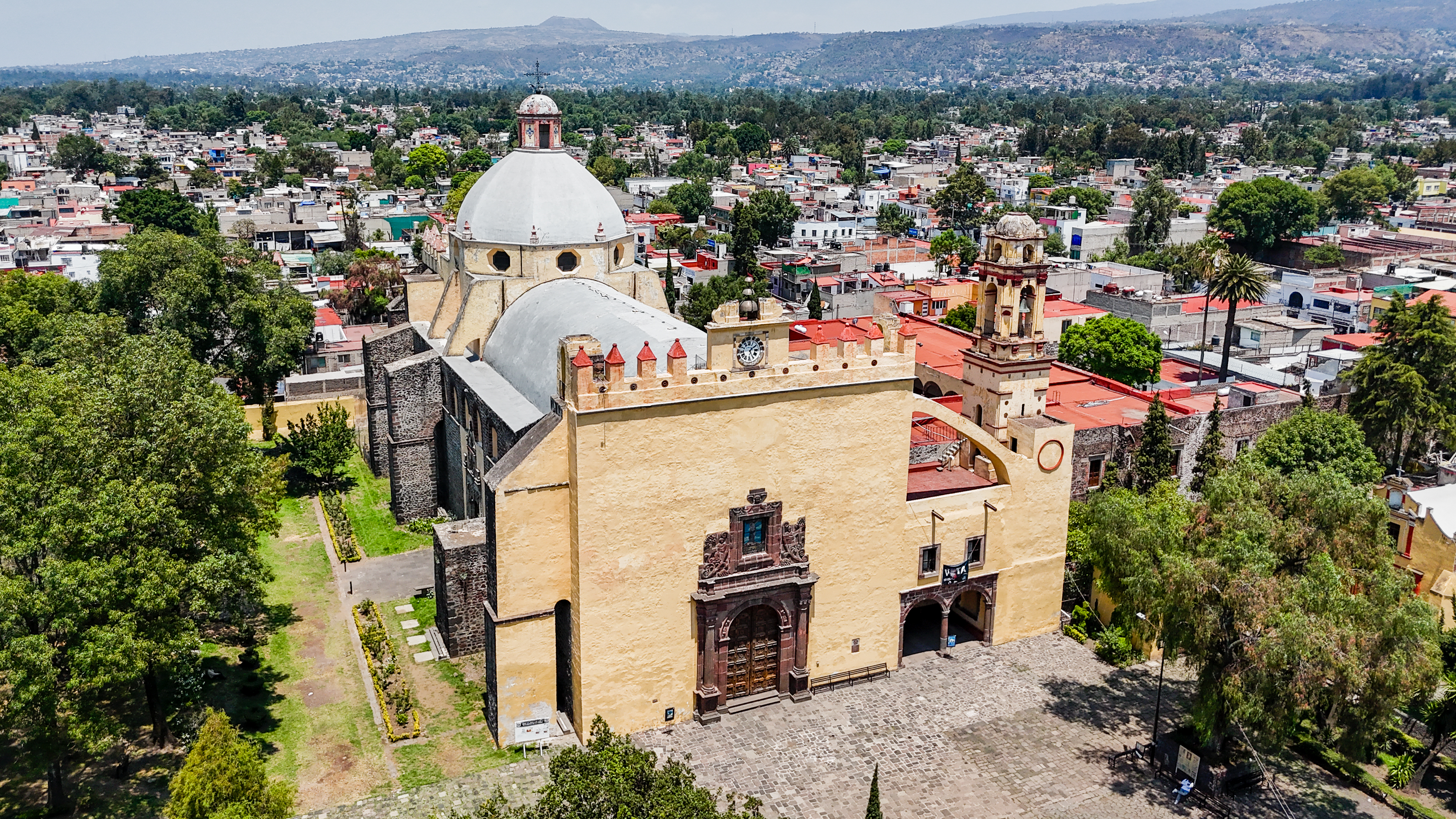
Main facade of the church

San Bernardino de Siena Church is the parish church of the borough of Xochimilco in Mexico City. The church and former monastery complex was built in the 16th century over a former pre-Hispanic temple as part of evangelization efforts after the Spanish conquest of the Aztec Empire. Since its construction, it has been the center of much of Xochimilco’s history and social life, including ceremonies related to is famous image of the Child Jesus called the Niñopa. The interior of the church contains a rare 16th-century altarpiece in Plateresque style with no columns or other supports. The only other altarpiece like it is in Huejotzingo, Puebla.

== History ==
When the Spanish arrived, Xochimilco was a dependency of Tenochtitlan and sided with the Aztecs against the Spanish. Hernán Cortés attacked Xochimilco in 1521 just before attacking Tenochtitlan, which left few survivors. After the fall of the Aztec Empire, evangelization in the area began rapidly. The last Xochimilco ruler, Apochquiyauhtzin, was baptized with the name of Luís Cortés Cerón de Alvarado in 1522, which allowed him to remain ruler. Martín de Valencia started formal mass evangelization in 1524, along with other monks such as Alfonso Paz Monterrey, Juan de Nozarmendia, Juan Lazcano, Cristóbal de Zea, Gregorio Basurto, Pedro de Gante, Francisco de Gamboa, Francisco Soto, Juan de Gaona, Bernardino de Sahagún and Francisco Bautista.

Initially, a small church was built on the site of the old pre-Hispanic temple. However, as Xochimilco was the most important settlement in the south of the Valley of Mexico, construction of a monumental church began in 1535 under the direction of Francisco de Soto. A number of smaller satellite churches were also founded, such as the chapel of San Pedro, as well as a hospital called Concepción Tlacoapa. The church and monastery complex was built in various stages from 1535 to 1600. The monastery portion was completed by 1538. By 1585, the main church was completed, along with further dormitories and other areas for resident monks. The cloister was finished in 1604. Most of the money for construction was provided by the indigenous leaders of Xochimilco, with Martín Cerón de Álvaro providing most.

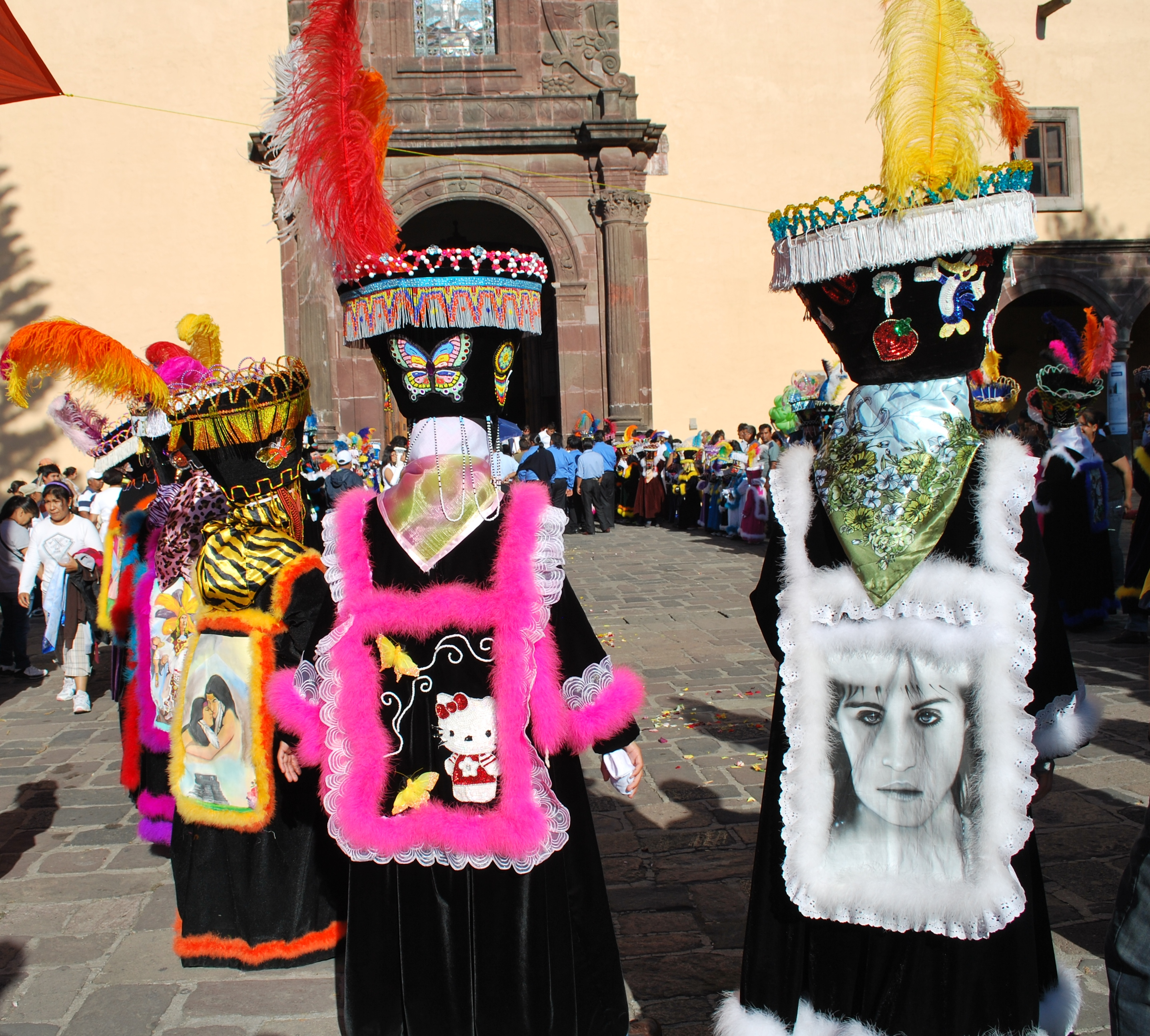
A group of Chinelos dancers in front of the church accompanying the Niñopa image as it visits

Since then, much of the history and social life of Xochimilco has revolved around this church. It has served as a center of social cohesion and identity for the town and the borough. Due to the lack of monks, the Franciscans decided to withdraw the few that were there in 1538. However, the indigenous people of the area protested and two monks were allowed to remain on a permanent basis. In 1552, part of the main portal fell and was reconstructed, finished in 1590. In 1569, there were four monks in charge of the evangelization of about 5,000 indigenous people, with Friar Jerónimo de Mendieta in charge. In 1585, the number increased to six. A school was founded at the monastery in 1609 to teach rhetoric, theology, arts and letters.

The church was in charge of various communities outside Xochimilco proper, including Santiago Tepalcatlalpan, San Lucas Xochimanca, San Mateo Pochtla, San Miguel Topilejo, San Francisco Tlalnepantla, San Salvador Cuautenco, Santa Cecilia Ahuautla, San Andrés Ocoyoacac, San Lorenzo Tlatecpan, San Martín Tiatilpan, Santa Maria Nativitas Zacapan and Santa Cruz Acalpixcan, which are now in the boroughs of Xochimilco and Tlalpan. As the population adopted Christianity, they were allowed to keep a number of traditional practices to mix with Catholic rites. The best known of these traditions centers on the Niñopa, an image of the Child Jesus which dates to the 16th century. It and other images of its type were promoted by the evangelists to replace a cult to a child god which was prevalent in Xochimilco at the time of the Conquest of the Aztec Empire. Today, this image is cared for by one family for a year, changing houses on 2 February with this most important annual event of the borough occurring at this church.

The church and former monastery were declared a national monument in 1932.

The church and monastery underwent major restoration work in the 1960s, covering the architectural elements as well as the paintings, altarpieces and sculpture. During this period there was pressure to use parts of the vast complex and atrium for other uses. Two primary schools, Vicente Riva Palacio and Ignacio Ramírez, were on the property until the 1970s.

== Description ==
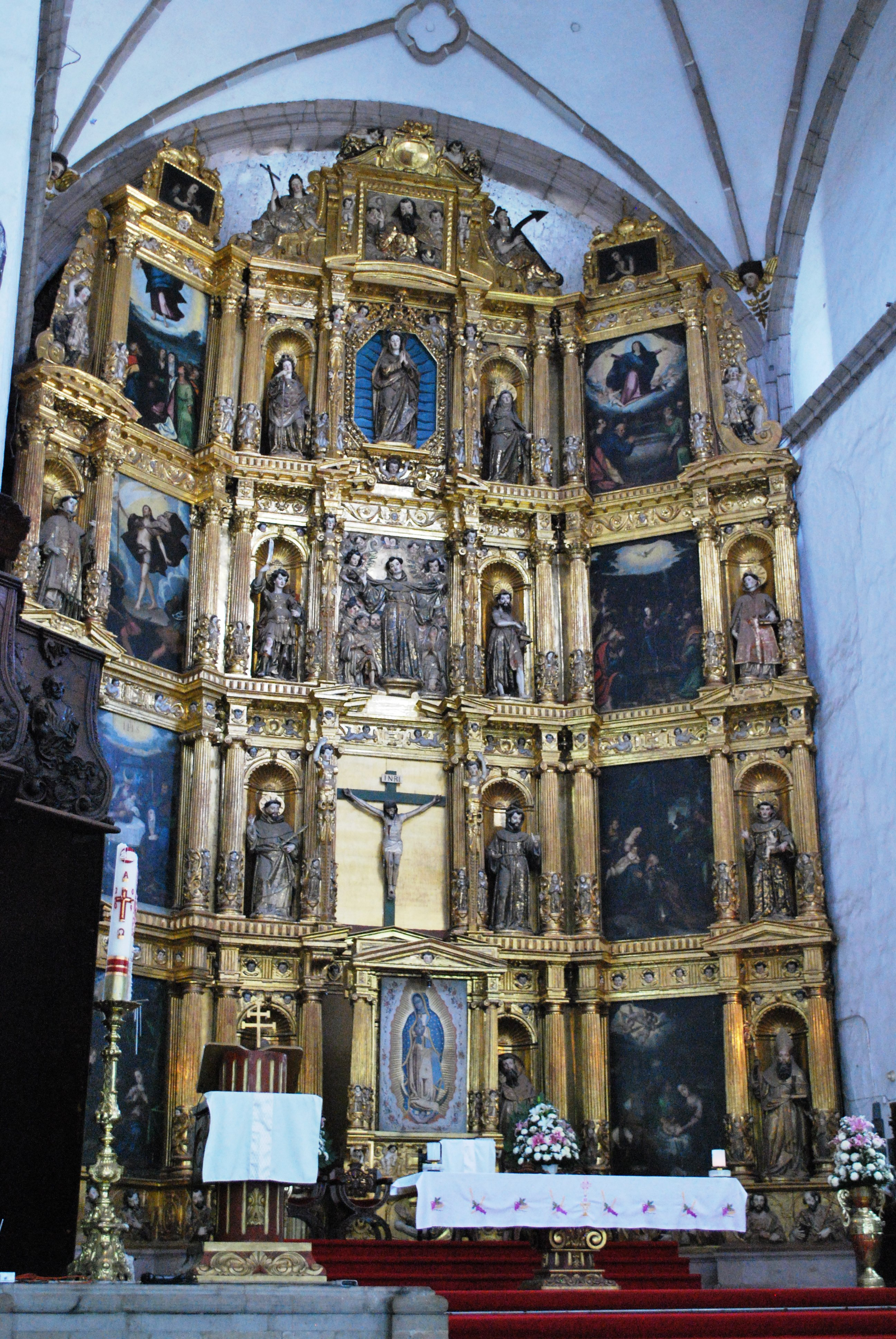
16th-century main altar inside the church

San Bernardino is located in the historic center of Xochimilco, across from the former town’s main plaza and borough hall. The church faces east and the cloister is on the south side to protect it from prevailing winds. It is fronted by an oversized atrium, which was common for churches built in Mexico in the 16th century.

The main facade is simple, emphasizing the main portal. It consists of an arch flanked by two pilasters. Above this, integrated into the portal is the choir window. At the top of the facade are various merlons, originally constructed for defense purposes, a clock from the 19th century and small bell gable. The tower dates from 1716 and the clock from 1872. Originally the church was built with a wooden roof, but this was later replaced by vaults. The dome was finished in 1700. The side portal is a mix of Plateresque and Gothic with indigenous elements.

On the side of the main portal there are three arches of the open chapel, which symbolize the three peoples of the area (indigenous, Spanish and mestizo) and was the area where baptisms took place. This area leads to the former monastery cloister, whose upper level contains remnants of frescos from the colonial period.

There is also a small chapel called the Capilla de la Tercera Orden, located just outside the cloister. It has only one nave, constructed in four sections in the 17th century. Its main portal is small and resembles the style of the main church. The chapel used to function as a tabernacle.

Inside, the most important furnishing is the 16th-century main altarpiece, one of the few left in Mexico. It is in Plateresque style with Renaissance elements. It is distinct in that it has no columns, architraves or other obvious supports. The only other altarpiece similar to it is found in Huejotzingo, Puebla. The altarpiece is a series of frames and niches covered in gold leaf. On one side of the altarpiece on the second level, there is an image of Christ. This painting dates from the 16th century but is incomplete. On the other side of the same level, there is a painting of the Holy Family, painted in the 17th or 18th century. From the same time period is an image of the Most Pure Virgin on the third level, but it is not in its original place. On the fourth level, there is another image of Christ which dates from the 16th or 17th century, and another on the fifth level from the 17th century. Our Lady of Mount Carmen appears on the fifth level, painted in the 17th century, and the Martyrdom of Saint Peter is on the sixth level, painted in the 17th or 18th century. Also on the sixth level, there is an image of the Passion from the 17th century, but it is in poor condition and unstable. An image of Saint Sebastian from the 17th century is on the seventh level.

The image of Saint Sebastian is paired with an image of the Apostle James the Great. This is because in the late 16th century, Xochimilco had an epidemic of a sickness called cocoliztli for over a year. Prayers to these two saints were attributed to the final disappearance of the malady. Among the various statues on this main altar, there is a relief of Bernardino of Siena surrounded with sculptures representing the indigenous leaders who helped to build the church and monastery.

In the rest of the church and monastery there are paintings and frescos, some of which are by famous artists such as Baltasar de Echave, his son Simon Pereyns, Sánchez Samerón Caravaggio, Francisco Martínez, Luis Arciniegas and Juan Martínez Montañés. On the columns of the main nave there are frescos of the Twelve Apostles .

The finer pews are made of red cedar, as are the two pulpits. All were made by a carpenter named Juan Rojas in the 18th century.
