= Niñopa =

Coordinates: 19°15′46.8″N 99°6′7.44″W

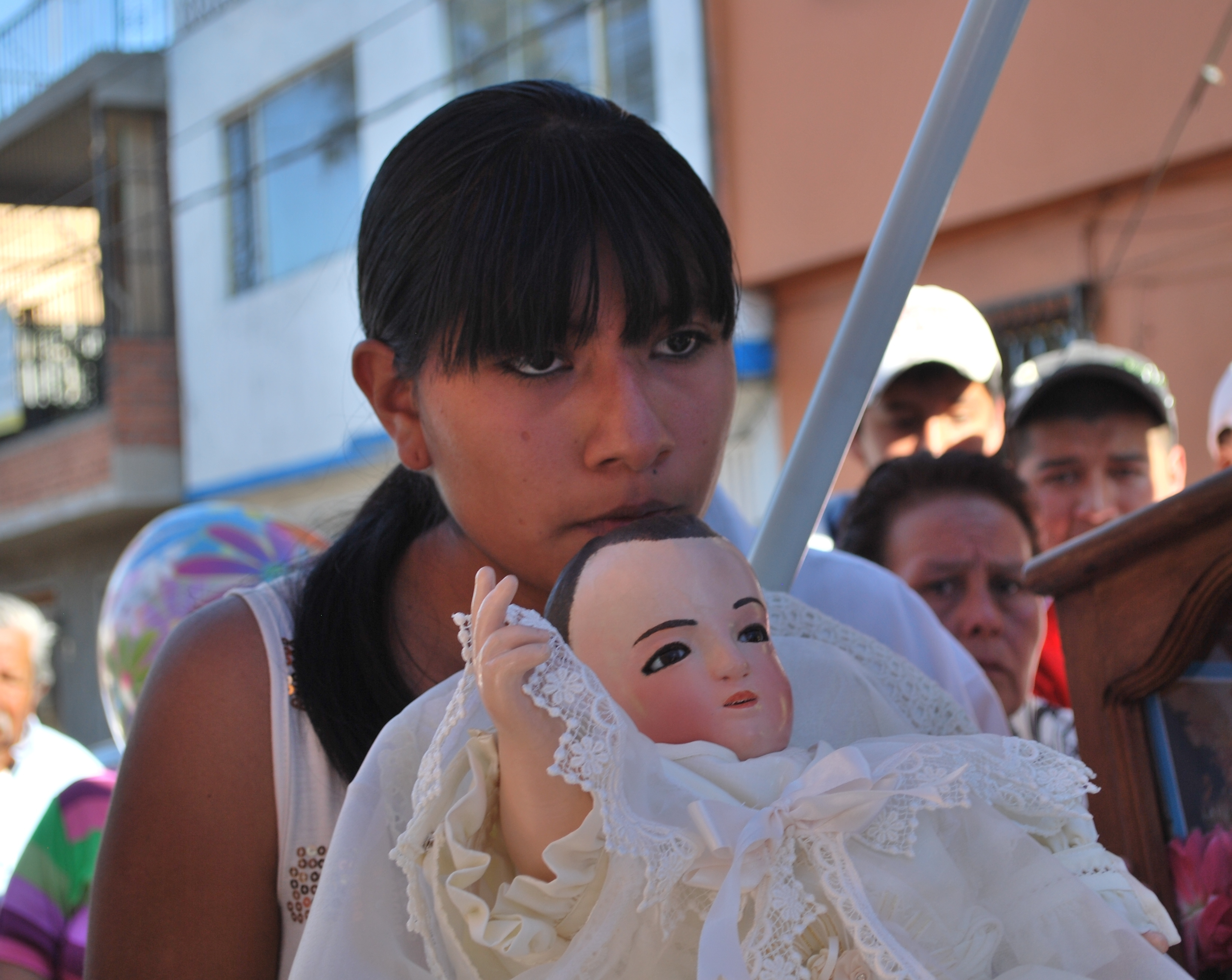
Niñopa in procession in Xochimilco

The Niñopa or Niñopan is the most venerated image of the Child Jesus in the Mexico City borough of Xochimilco. It was created over 430 years ago in the San Bernardino monastery, as part of evangelization efforts. Since then it has been in the possession of the community. Rather than being kept in the parish church it is in the custody of a sponsor or mayordomo, whose family is in charge of the many festivities and traditions associated with the image for a year. These include taking care of the image proper along with taking the image to church and to visit the sick. It also includes sponsoring many parties especially on certain dates such as Candlemas and Day of the Child on April 30.

== The image and names ==
The Niñopa is the most venerated of Xochimilco's various important Child Jesus images which include the Niño Dormidito, the Niño de Belén, the Niño Tamalerito, the Niño Grande and the Niño de San Juan.

The image dates from 1573 and has since been in the possession of the town of Xochimilco. The image is 51 cm (20 in) tall and weighs 598 grams (21.1 oz). It was designed to be placed seated or lying down. Its right hand is raised as an act of benediction. It has light brown eyes of crystal with black eyelashes. Its nose is small and rounded. The ears are also small but not well defined. The mouth is slightly open as if about to speak, with the upper lip a more intense red than the lower. The skin is white and somewhat pink.

As the image is over 430 years old, it must be handled with care to keep it from deteriorating. Instituto Nacional de Antropología e Historia (INAH) has recommended that the image be dressed only in light clothing with no metal such as zippers or hooks in order to conserve the surface. They also recommend that all photographs be taken without flash and without kissing the image directly, only the clothing.

The image has been called by several variations of the name including "Niñopa", "Niño-pa" and "Niñopan". According to the municipal historian, Rodolfo Cordero, the name is "Niño-pa" and derives from "niño" (child) and a shortening of "padre" (father) to "pa" with a meaning of Father Child. The alternative "Niñopan" is the Spanish niño (child) with the Nahuatl pan (place) meaning "child of the place". The historian notes that the denotation of "Niñopan" has grown in popularity, surpassing "Niñopa". Other names include Niño Peregrino (Pilgrim Child) and Niño del Pueblo (Child of the Town/People). Others state that the real name is "Niñopan" and that "Niñopa" is a mistaken interpretation to mean "Niño Patron" (as in patron saint, which it is not) or Niño Padre, but the image represents the Son of God, not God the Father. Another name for the Niñopa is the Niño Consentido (Well-Cared-For Child).

== History ==
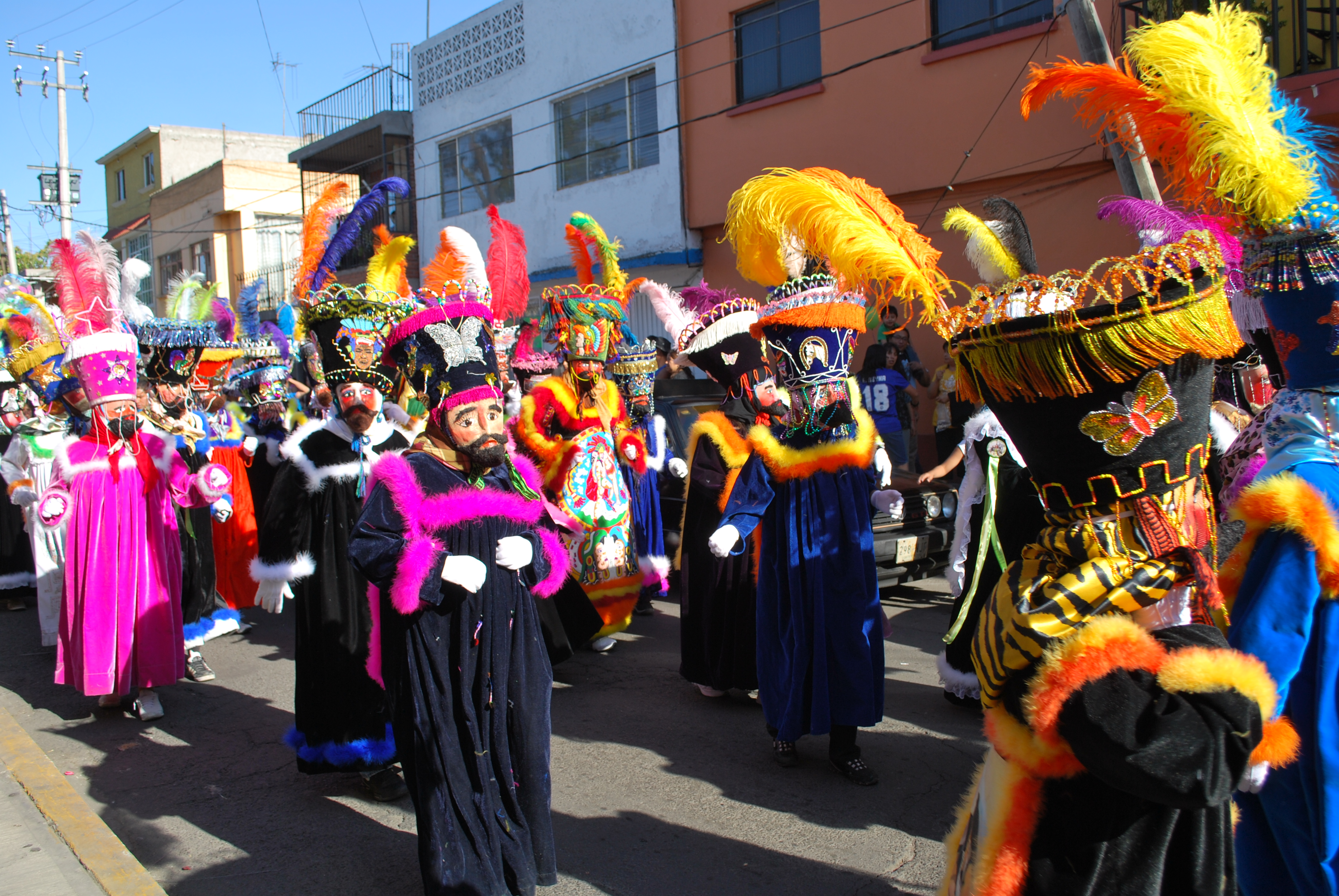
Chinelos in procession with the Niñopa

The story of its origin was that it was brought from Valencia, Spain, by Martin Cortés, arriving in Xochimilco in 1586, made of the wood of an orange tree. Before he died, Cortés gifted his Child Jesus images, making each recipient mayordomos. When one of these died, who was Martín Cerón de Alvarado (grandson of Hernán Cortés), a chest in Michoacán was opened to find the Niñopa, which still smelled of oranges.

In reality, it was created in Xochimilco from a local wood most likely by an indigenous craftsman in the workshops of the San Bernardino monastery. Bernardino de Sahagún wrote that the indigenous of the Xochimilco area made offerings of corn to a child image of the god Huitzilopochtli on December 26. The Franciscans who evangelized the region also made note of this tradition. The evangelists created Child Jesus images to substitute for this tradition, including the Niñopa.

There are two possible reasons why this image is venerated. It is possible that the image belonged to the last indigenous ruler of Xochimilco Martín Cortés de Alvarado as his will states that he left several Child Jesus images to the town including one that fits the description of the Niñopa. The second is that the infant Jesus is figured prominently in various oil paintings on the altarpieces from the 16th and 17th centuries in the San Bernardino church and in the former monastery of Santa María Tepepan.

== Mayordomos ==
The traditions surrounding the image have not changed much in the over 400 years even though Xochimilco has transformed from a rural area to an urban one. As it is associated with popular religious expression and because of this, it does not reside in a church but rather with a family. It is part of popular religious expression and not official Church doctrine. Because of this, the image does not reside in a church but rather in the home of a family. He is "laid down to sleep" each night in a basket made for him, in his underclothes and wrapped in a blanket. Each morning, he is "awoken" to Las Mañanitas before he is dressed. Each evening it attends Mass before heading back to the home of the mayordomo. Since 1995, the image has been taken once a year for a "check up" with the "pediatrician", which is annual examination, including X-ray and maintenance work done by INAH. The image is hosted by a sponsor or "mayordomo" each year in the family home, often in a room built especially for the purpose. This area is open to the public with all free to come and go. It is believed that those who become a mayordomo of the image receive blessings and prosperity. The waiting list to host the image extends past 2040 and families have waited as much as fifty years. If the person on the waiting list dies beforehand, the privilege is inherited by another member of the family. Families who have hosted the image receive a life-sized copy.

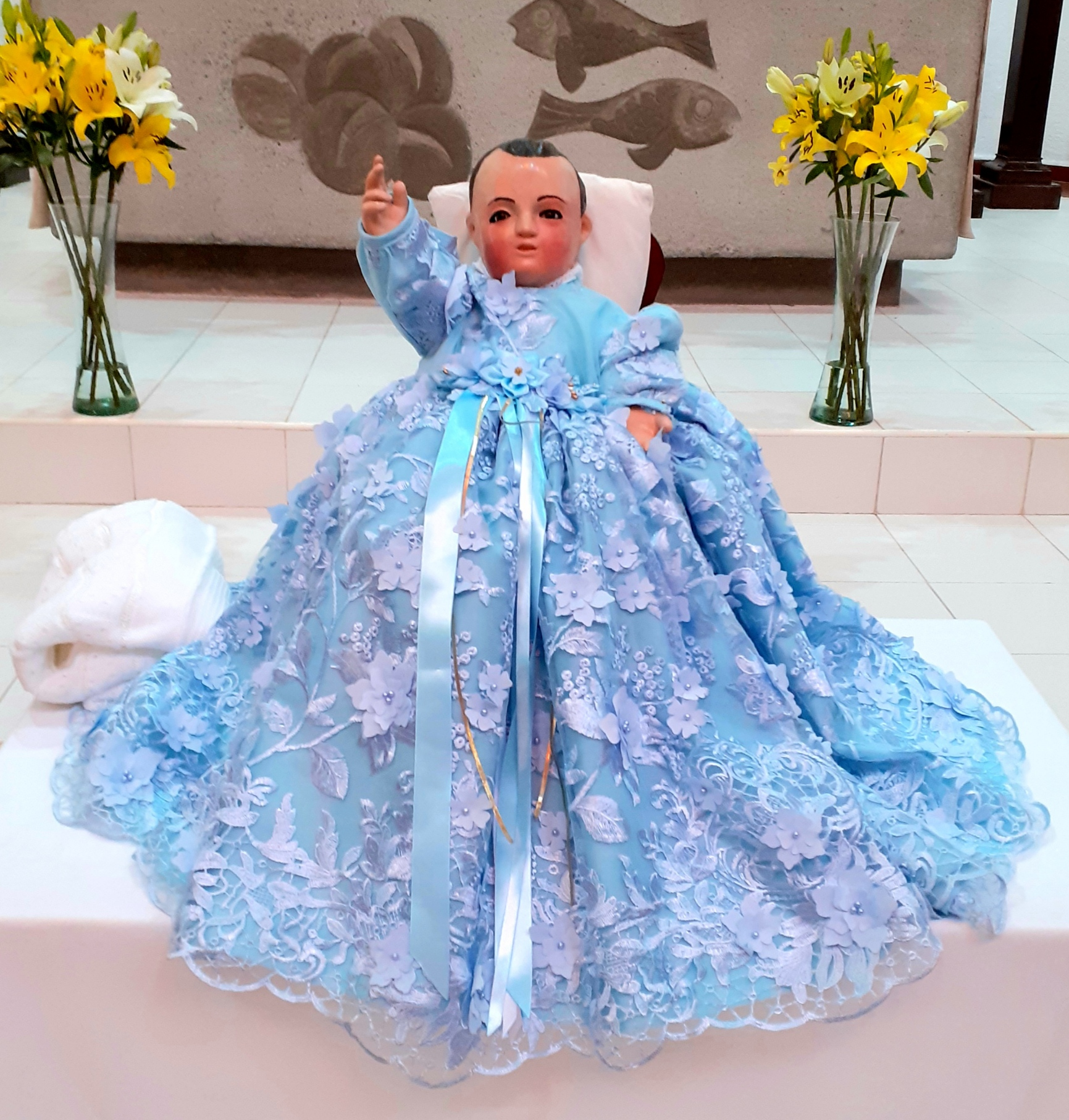
El Niñopa, image of the highly venerated Child Jesus in Xochimilco, Mexico City. 2022.

In addition to the care of the physical image, the mayordomo is in charge for the many festivities and traditions that surround it. Almost every day, the image leaves to attend Mass and to visit families, the sick and hospitals. This is done with fanfare, accompanied by musicians, Chinelo dancers, mariachis, tunas called "estudiantinas" in Mexico, fireworks, traditional foods such as mole, mixiote and various types tamales and more. This is even the case when the image is taken for its yearly "check up", brought to INAH in Coyoacán from Xochimilco. The reason for this is that the image represents the life that God gives and the purpose is to take care of this life.

While there are festivities around the image almost every day of the year, some are private and some public. The most important include Las Posadas (December 16–24), Three King's Day (January 6), Candlemas (February 2) and Day of the Child (April 30) .

=== Candlemas Change of Caretakers ===
The most important of these is February 2, Candlemas, when the mayordomo family of the image changes for the year. This events draws thousands of spectators, many carrying photos and posters of the Niñopa, from both Xochimilco and outside. The crowd was estimated at 4,000 in 2007. The festivities on February 2 is part of a tradition where families take their images of the Child Jesus to church, especially dressed for the occasion, to be blessed. After the mass for Candlemas, the bishop takes the Niñopa from the outgoing mayordomos and transfers it to the new ones. Everyone at the event is fed traditional food such as mole, rice, pork and tamales. This ceremony is also associated with the blessing of seeds for good harvests as well as the blessing of candles to be lit in case of illness or death the duality of life and death, a pre Hispanic element. Candlemas marks the beginning of the growing season for the chinampas of Xochimilco. The ceremony includes baskets of seeds such as corn, beans, lentils, wheat and more. While agriculture is no longer the main economic activity, these seeds represent abundance. Because of the large quantity of clothes and other items, it takes up to two trucks to move the image from one house to another. 2011 was the first time that the Archbishop of Mexico (Norberto Rivera Carrera) participated in the event.

The image receives gifts year round but especially on Three Kings' Day on January 6 and on the International Day of the Child on April 30. Most of these gifts are later distributed among children from poor families.

On April 30, the festivities occur at the house of the mayordomo, who offers food to guests. Visitors leave offerings of toys, flowers and fruit. In the streets, the mayordomos also place various castillos with fireworks and amusement rides.

During the Las Posadas, the Niñopa leaves the house of the mayordomo each day to a different Xochimilco neighborhood, accompanied by an image of the Virgin Mary, Chinelos, music and many followers. It goes to the designated house, owned by the "posadero". The house and the surrounded street are elaborately decorated with paper ornaments, lamps, flowers and Christmas gifts. Hundreds of people attend to sing and otherwise take part. At noon, the posadero and the rest of the procession accompany the Niñopa to church. After they return there is more singing, music, Chinelos and food. There are no social class distinctions at this event and no alcohol is served. A fireworks frame called a "castillo" (castle) is burned and at the end of the day, dozens of piñatas are broken and a dance begins for the evening. This repeats each day of the Las Posadas until December 24, when the Niñopa is laid in a manger to sleep in the San Bernardino parish.

== Stories about the image ==
Because of its age and the uncertainty of its origin, there have been a number of stories surrounding the image. One of the disproven ones include that there is a pre Hispanic image inside and the image is not original. The last stems from a story that the original Niñopa was lost in a canal in the San Antonio Molotlan neighborhood in 1940. Its origin from Spain and orange tree wood was disproven in the 1970s, when the image was dropped and a finger broke. This allowed examination of the wood, which was determined of a tree locally called "chocolín" and made at the workshops of the San Bernardino de Siena monastery in the 16th or 17th century.

One persistent story is that the image comes to life. Many of these revolve around the image playing with its toys at night and even wandering outside. Evidence for this, say believers, is that toys are often strewn about, laughter is heard from the image's room, the image has dirty clothes in the morning and small footprints have been found in the yard of the house in which it is cared for. It is said that the color in his cheeks disappears when he is angry and is more red when his is happy. He is even said to smile more. It is also claimed that the Niñopa travels into the dreams of petitioners, especially sick children.

Most stories revolve around miracles attributed to the image. These include curing disease, bringing peace to fighting families, helping with finances, finding work and more. The Niñopa has received penitents from other countries as well, including a woman from the U.S. who claimed to have been cured of terminal cancer after seeing the image on television. One story states that a mayordomo planted lilies which were destroyed by a hailstorm. The money from the crop was destined for festivities for the image. Without money, he asked the image's forgiveness and arranged for various masses in the Niñopa's honor. After this, the damaged lilies began to grow again.

== See also ==
- Child Jesus images in Mexico
- List of statues of Jesus
