= Child Jesus images in Mexico =

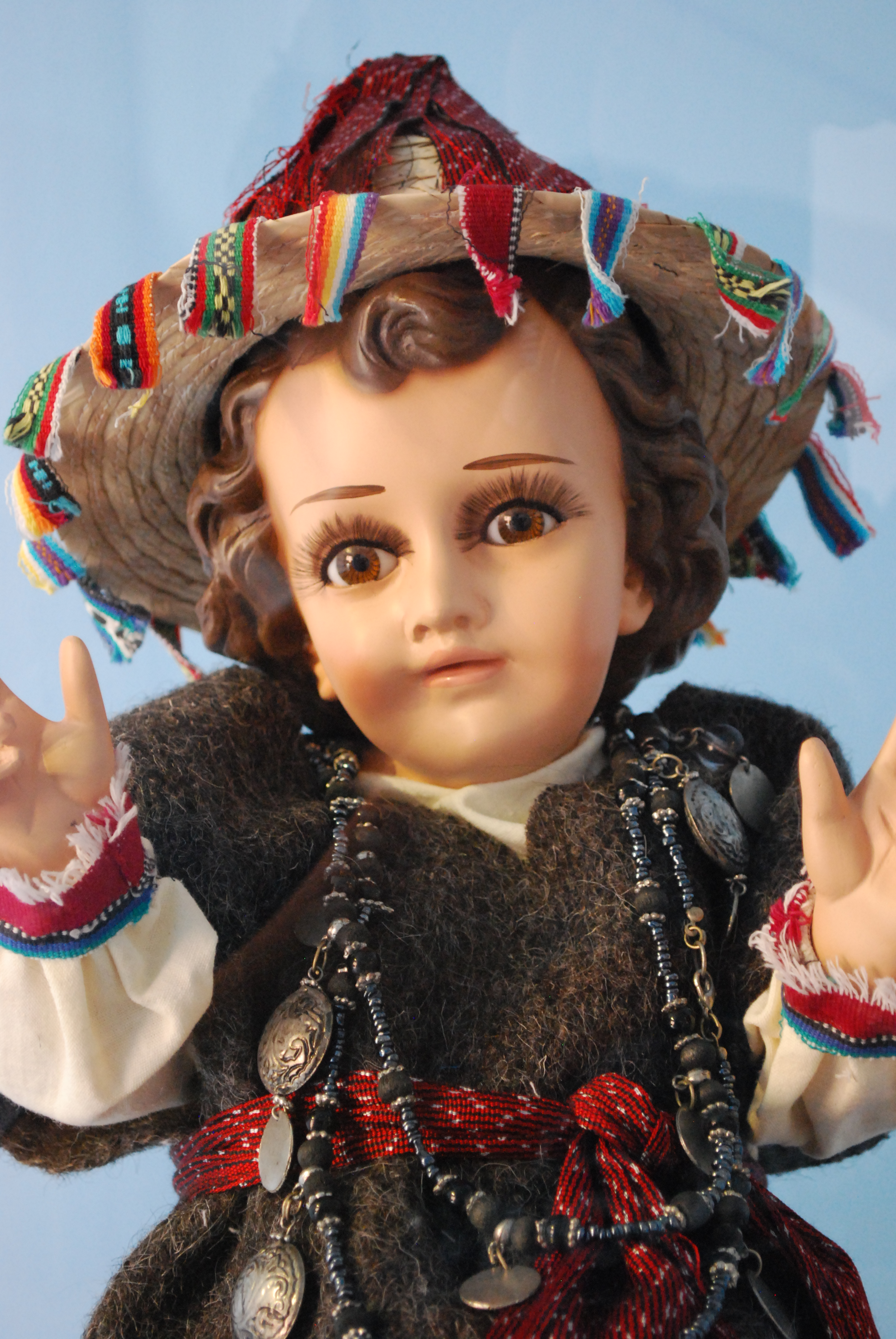
Niños Dios image dressed in Tzotzil garb

The Niño Dios (literally Child God) of Mexico is a tradition of venerating the Child Jesus in Mexico which has taken root from the time it was introduced in the 16th century and then synchronized with pre-Hispanic elements to form some unique traditions. Mexican Catholics have their own images of the Child Jesus, which is honored and celebrated during the Christmas season, especially on Christmas Eve and on Candlemas (2 February). One tradition unique to Mexico is to dress the image in new clothing each year for presentation at Mass on Candlemas. This dress can vary from representations of the saints, Aztec dress, football/soccer players and more. Also, there are Niño Dios images which are locally famous and honored year-round.

== History ==
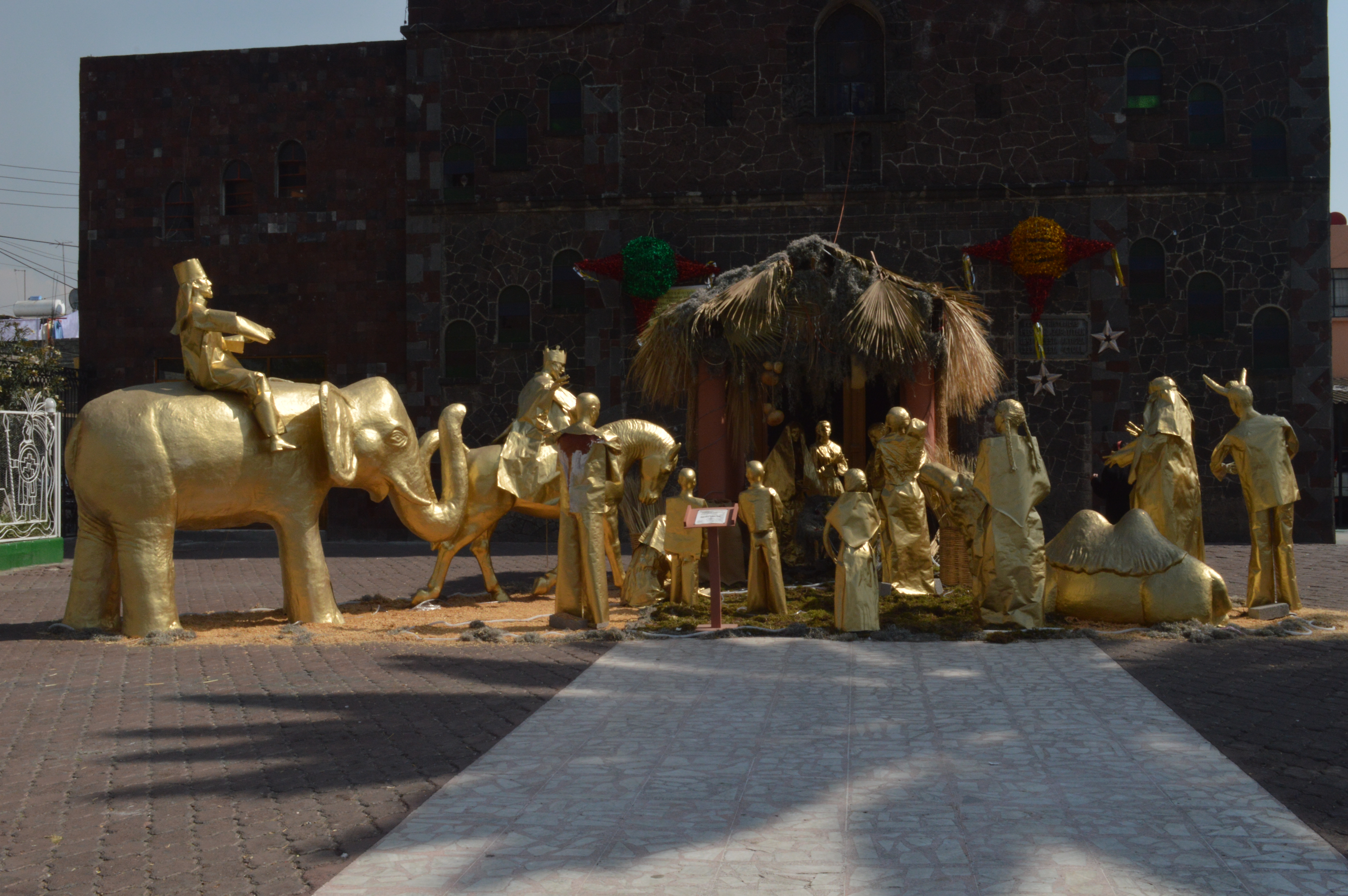
View of the nativity scene in front of the parish church of Santiago Zapotitlan in the Tláhuac borough of Mexico City

Veneration of the Child Jesus is a European tradition with the best-known examples being the Infant Jesus of Prague and the Santo Niño de Atocha. This tradition was brought by the Spanish to Mexico after the Spanish conquest of the Aztec Empire; In Mexico this veneration has taken on indigenous elements, and is considered to be one of the most deeply rooted Catholic traditions in Mexico. Part of the reason for this was that native Mexicans already had traditions of representing deities in painting or sculpture with rites dedicated to that incarnation, including dramatizations. One of the oldest traditions related to the Child Jesus in Mexico is the "pastorela", a dramatization based on the birth of Jesus. The "Adoración de los Reyes Magos" (The Adoration of the Magi) was probably the first "pastorela" in Mexico which was organized by Friar Andrés de Olmos. It was written in Nahuatl and there were adaptations to indigenous culture in the script as well. The tradition of reenacting scenes from the birth of Christ was recognized by Juan de Zumárraga, the first bishop of New Spain who ordered that this practice be widespread for evangelization. Very early on, these reenactments began to vary by local custom and region and were most frequently done by the lower classes. The main theme of these works is the journey of the Three Wise Men to Bethlehem, but demons try to get in their way. In most versions, the demons are vanquished by the Archangel Michael or another angel and the Wise Men arrive to their destination. Characters most often include shepherds, demons, angels and the Wise Men. Other characters sometimes appear such as Mary and Joseph, Indians, ranchers and monks. At the end of the play, all kiss the image of the infant Jesus.

== Christmas Eve ==
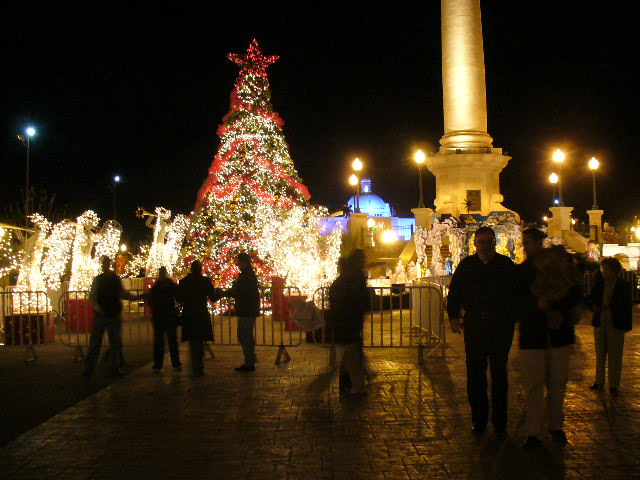
Christmas tree and lights in the main plaza of the city of Chihuahua

Veneration of the Christ child is strongest during the Christmas season, which officially begins a week or so before Christmas Eve (with posadas) and ends on Candlemas, 2 February. On Christmas Eve, the figure of the Christ child is laid into the Nativity scene in a celebration which is done in the home. This event is called "put the child to bed." The figure is carried by one or more of the young women while the rest of the family sings lullabies or other children's and/or Christmas songs. Each member of the family kisses the image as they sing. The figure is laid in the manger, where it stays until the second of February.

This ceremony varies by family and by community. For example, in the community of Dzitnup, in the municipality of Valladolid, the Maya people here have their own variation. In addition to the laying the child in the manger, there is a dance called "Abraham and Isaac". This dance includes people who play the two main characters as well as devils. The dance is accompanies by a pre-Hispanic wind instrument called a "tunkul", which is similar to the "teponatli" used in other states such as Guerrero and Puebla.

Another Christmas Eve tradition is for children to write letters to the Christ child, typically to ask for things like toys and clothes.

== Candelaria ==
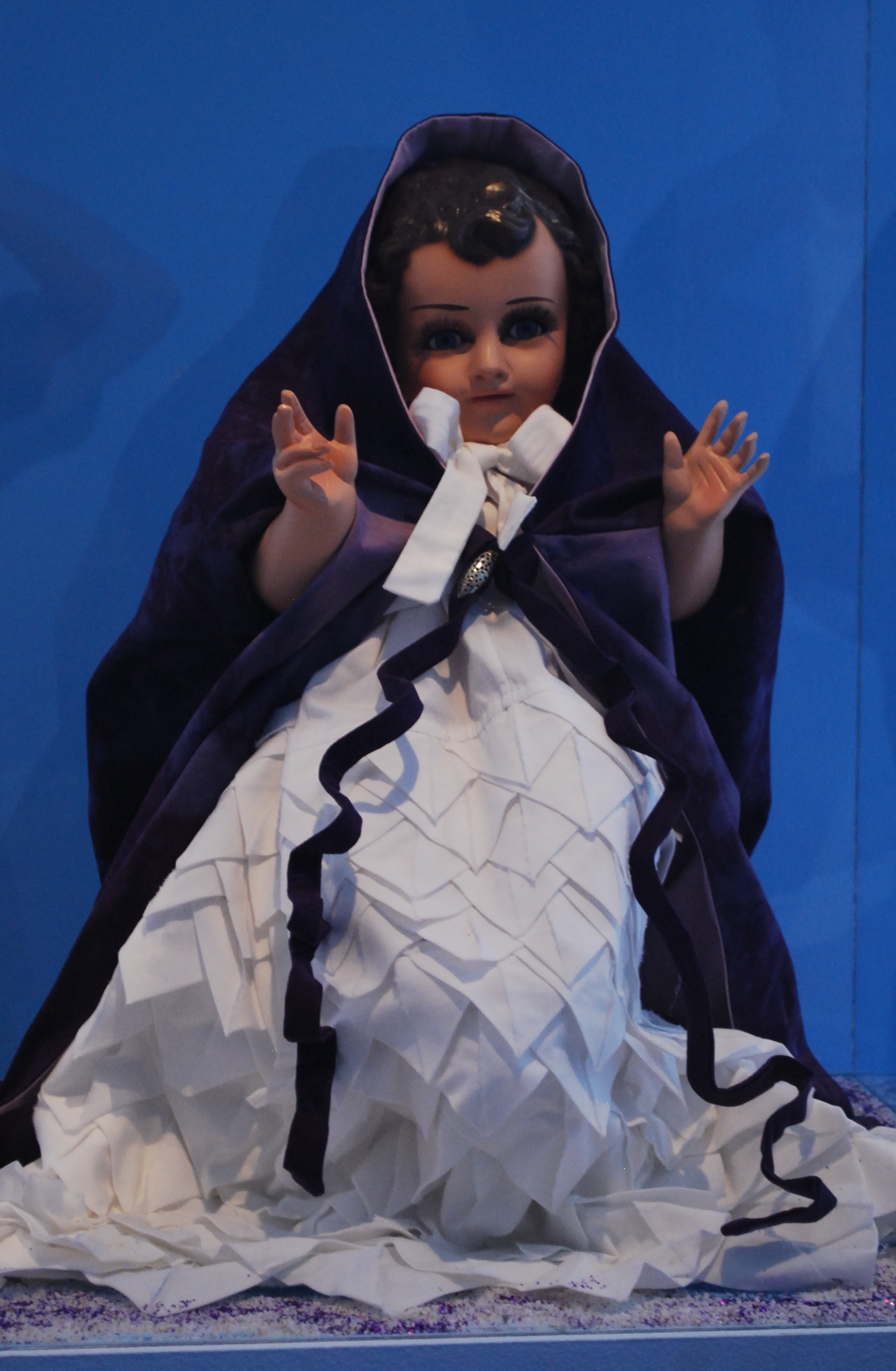
Niño Dios figure in more traditional christening garb

Candlemas (in Spanish, Candelaria), 2 February, marks the end of the Christmas season and nativity scenes generally remain intact in the home until this date. Preparation for Candelaria can begin on 6 January, known as "Three Kings Day". On this day, a ring-shaped sweet bread called a Rosca de Reyes is shared. Inside the Rosca, is one or more miniature figures of an infant are hidden. Those who find these figures have obligations to meet on Candelaria. These obligations always include being responsible for buying tamales and drinks for this day, but it can also signal a more serious commitment. It can mean that the person selected must purchase an outfit for the family's Niño Dios for one, two or three years. The person may also need to buy an outfit for the found miniature infant.

Each year, the Niño Dios of the household is brought to Mass on 2 February to be blessed. After the mass, the family returns home to celebrate, typically with tamales, buñuelos, atole and hot chocolate. The tradition recalls that forty days after Jesus's birth, Mary and Joseph took the child to the Temple to present to the priests.

To present the Niño Dios at Mass, tradition states that the image must be dressed in a new outfit. These outfits can vary widely but a number are most popular. For those who observe the three year commitment, the image is dressed in white for the first year, symbolizing purity. This is also the case if the image being presented is new. Other common and traditional outfits include Santo Niño de Atocha with crosier and seated on a chair, "Niño de las palomas" (Child of the doves) in a white robe with a dove between the hands, as San Francisco with sandals and brown robe, holding an animal, or "Niño de las azucenas" (Child of the lilies) with a white tunic and holding a bunch of lilies.

The need to buy a new outfit each year has given rise to a market in outfits for the images. Purchase of the outfits generally begins as early as December and continues until 2 February. Outfits range from the very simple made with inexpensive fabrics to elaborate creations in silk. The most common outfits are made with silk, satin, cotton and brocades decorated with silver or gold. Stationery stores generally sell the most traditional of outfits and the more expensive ones. However, these outfits are most commonly bought in traditional open markets called "tianguis". Here, more original ones can be found and can include various saints, pre-Hispanic dress, mariachis, soccer players and ethnic dress of various nationalities. Custom orders are also taken. Some priests frown upon the non-traditional outfits and only want white. Many of the outfits are original and some cause scandal, such as the Niño Dios dressed as a drug trafficker.

At the Casa de Cultura Griselda Alvarez in Mexico City, there was an exhibit of twenty four Niños Dios dressed in various ways: as a fisherman, as the Pope, as the Archangel Gabriel, as the Sacred Heart and as the Atocha. The collection is from the La Casa de los Niños Dios Uribe. The images vary and size from very small to very large and in material, mostly being of ceramic or wood.

== Particular Niño Dios images ==
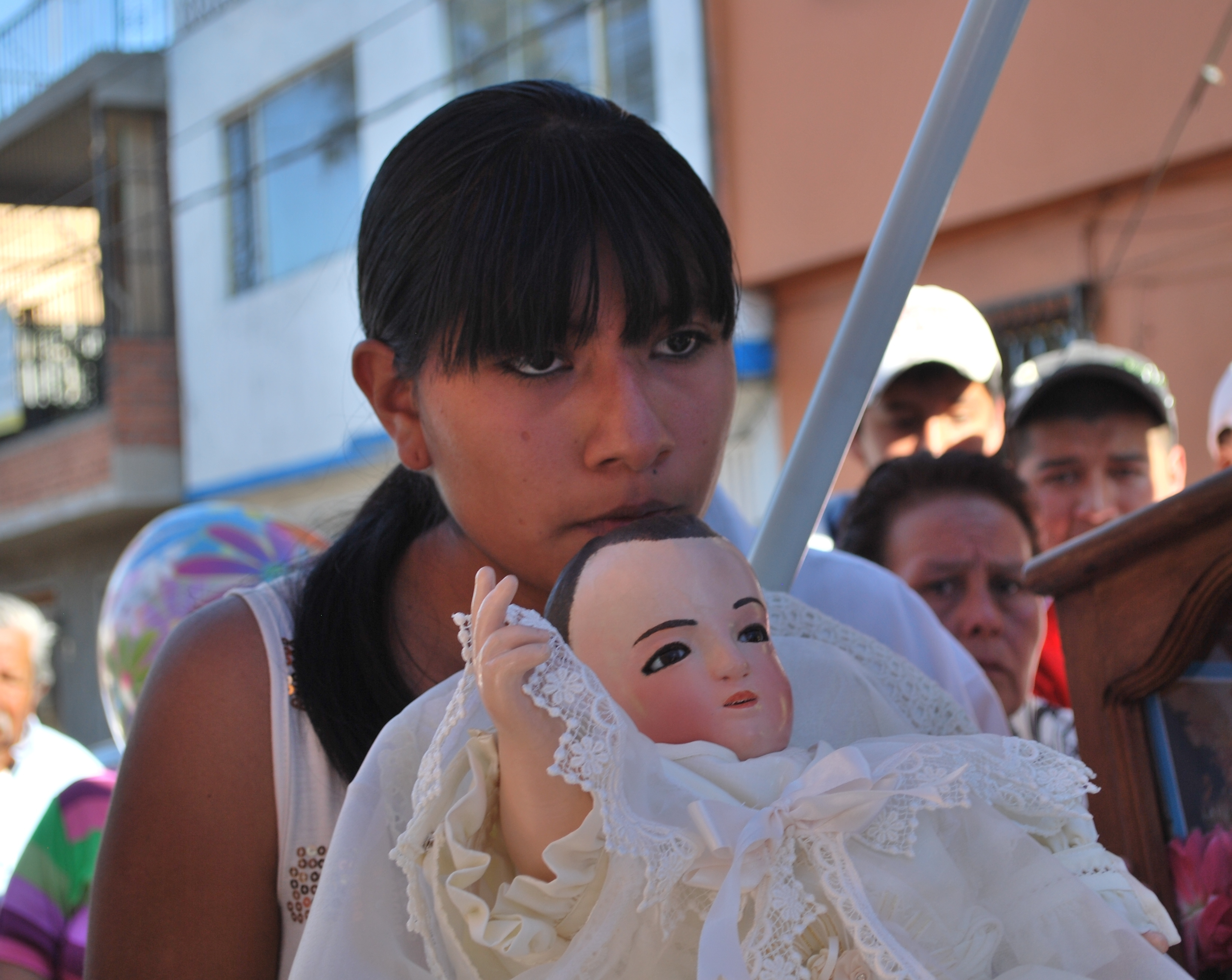
The Niñopa held by a girl during a procession in Xochimilco

In addition to the veneration of household Niños Dios during the Christmas season, there are a number of Child Jesus images that have year-round devotion. These Niños Dios often have a special place in the worship by Mexican Catholics, but sometimes they have been the objects of "kidnapping" and disputes. Most of the best-known images are in Mexico City and central Mexico. Offerings to these images are usually toys or candy, a tradition related to offerings made to the dead for the afterlife in pre-Hispanic times.

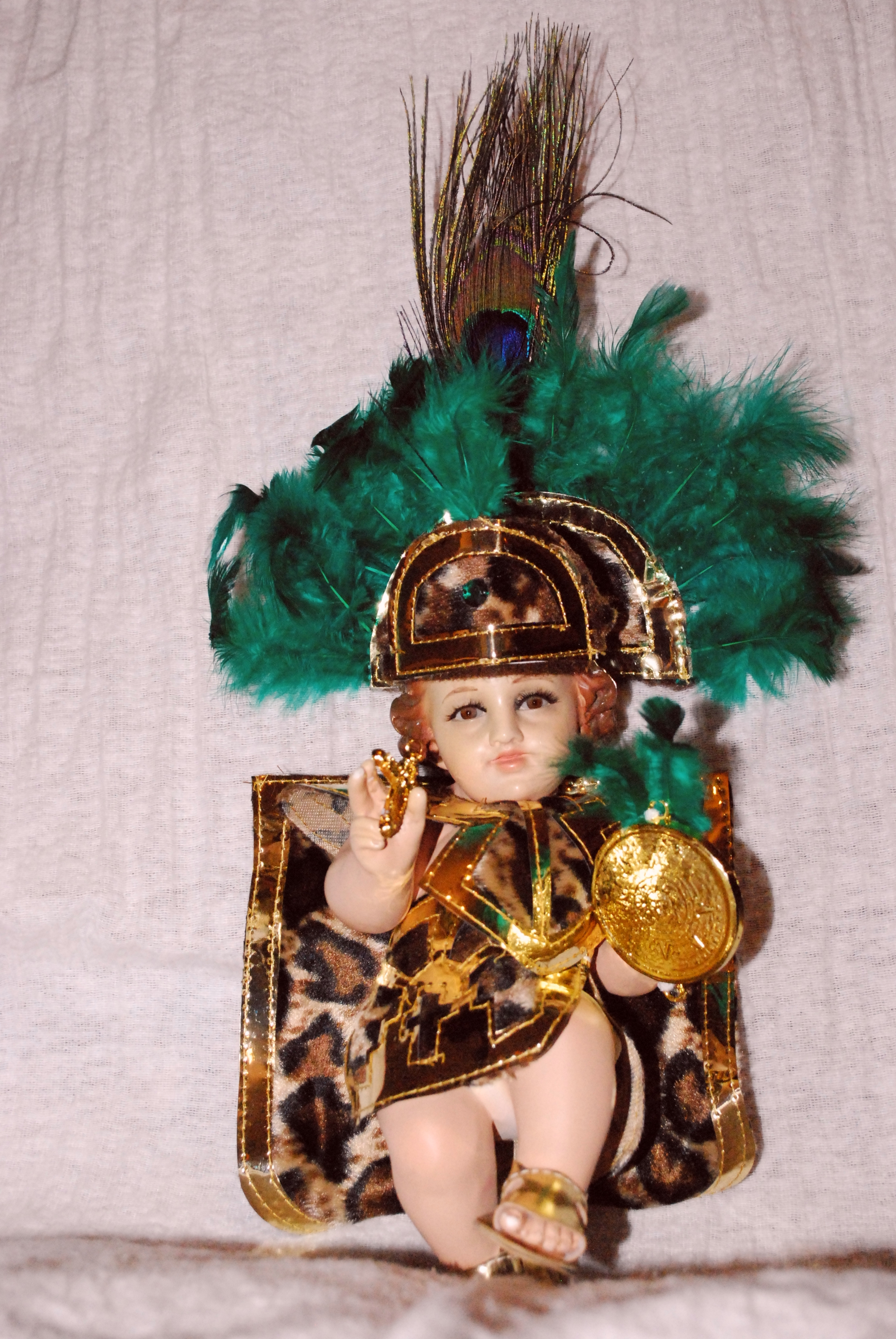
Niño Dios image dressed in Aztec costume

One of the earliest of the Niño Dios images in Mexico is the Niño Cautivo which is in the Metropolitan Cathedral. It was sculpted in the 16th century by Juan Martinez Montañez in Spain and purchased by the cathedral. However, on its way to Veracruz, pirates attacked the ship it was on and sacked it. To get the image back, a large ransom was paid. Today, the image is in the Chapel of San Pedro or De las Reliquias. Traditionally, the image has been petitioned by those seeking release from restrictions or traps, especially financial problems or drug addiction or alcoholism. The cult to the Niño Cautivo is considered to be "inactive" by INAH. However, this particular image has made a comeback since 2000 as one to petition when a family member is abducted and held for ransom.

Another famous Niño Dios is the Niñopa (also written Niño-Paor Niñopan) of Xochimilco, which is also from the 16th century. This image originally belonged to an indigenous chief called El Viejo. The name "Niño Pa" is a hybrid of the Spanish word for "child" (niño) and the Nahuatl word for "place" (pan) meaning "child of the place". It is said that this image goes about at night to visit people in their dreams and to check the crops of the community. Some claim to have found mud on the image's shoes in the morning.

This image has been housed in one family's home or another for over 430 years. The host family who become its "godparents" or mayodomos for the year. To be a "godparent" for this image is a great honor in Xochimilco, with the list extending until 2035 with families waiting fifty years. The family prepares a special bedroom in their home to house the child for the year. Those families who have housed the image in past years have replicas of the Niño Pa.

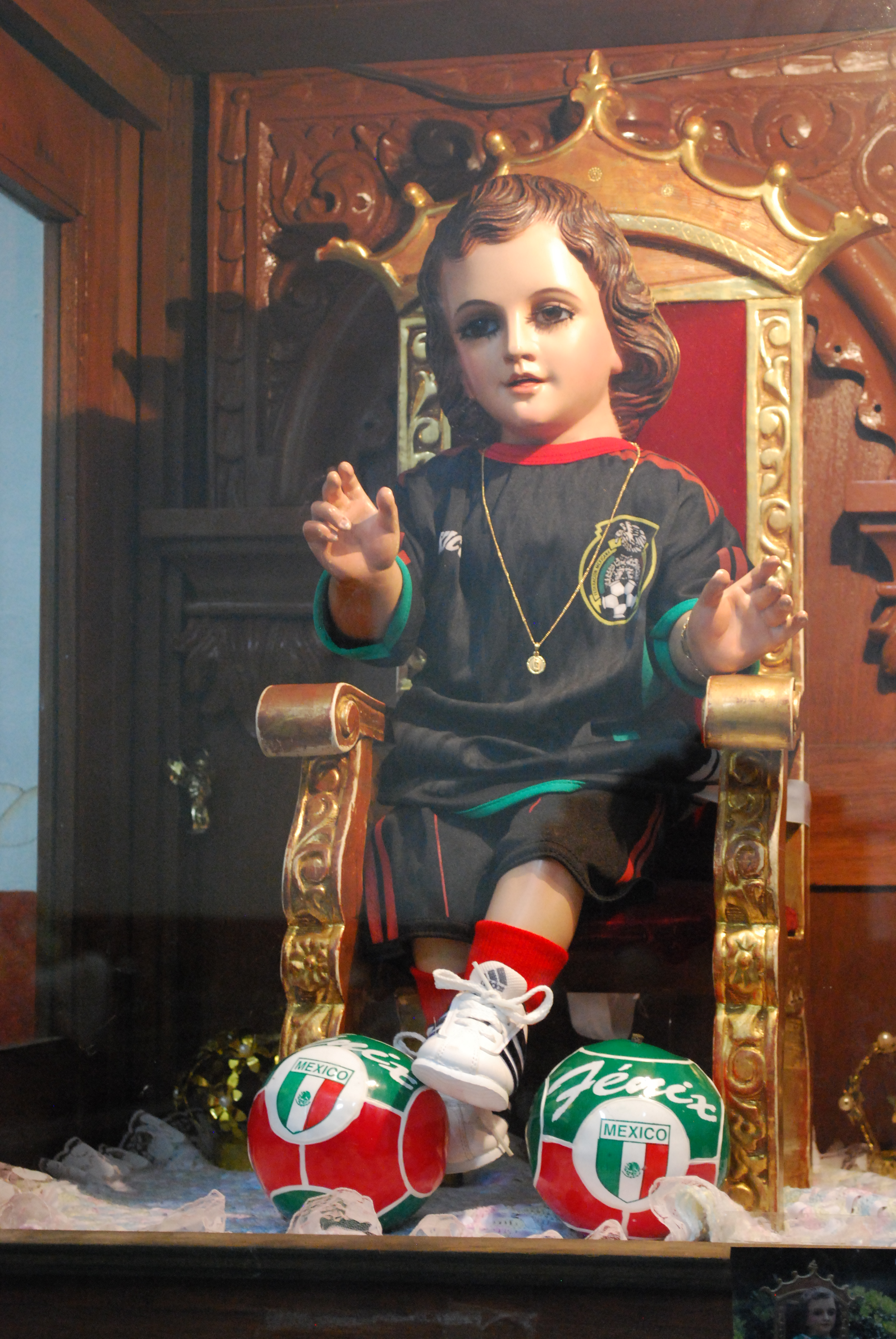
Niño de los Milagros or Niño Futbolista in the uniform of the Mexico football team for World Cup 2010

It is claimed that this image made itself invisible when government soldiers came to claim it during the Cristero War. It was presumed that the image was made of orange tree wood because of the writings about it by Martín Serón y Alvarado. However, this was proven false in the 1970s, when the image was dropped and a finger broke off. It is made the wood from a tree called "chocolín" in the workshops of Bernardino of Siena in the 16th or 17th century.

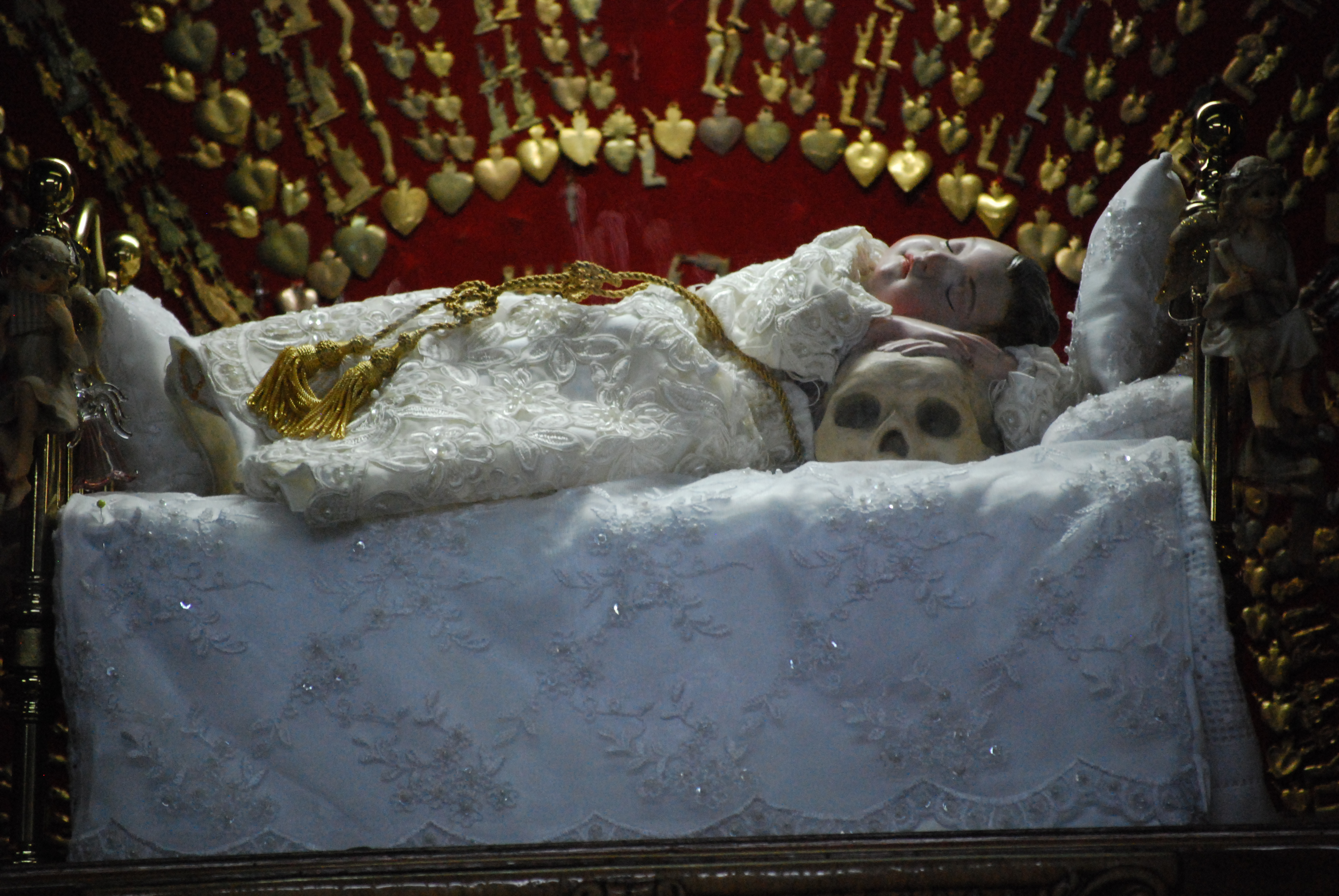
Niño de las Suertes

The Niño de las Suertes has a strong following due to its association with Santa Muerte. While the image was created in the 19th century, its popular veneration is a recent phenomenon. The image was found by two evangelists in the rubble of the Hacienda of San Juan de Dios in Tlalpan. It was handed over to Archbishop Francisco Lizana y Beaumont. As a number of monasteries wanted to claim it, the archbishop decided to make the decision by lottery. It is said that this image favored the Convent of San Bernardo due to the vow of poverty by its nuns. This was confirmed by doing the drawing three times. In the 19th century, due to tensions between the Mexican government and the Church, the image was moved to Tacubaya when the convent was secularized. This image has a skull by the infant's head. This originally symbolized the future Passion, but recently it has made this image associated with Santa Muerte, whose devotees visit.

In Tacuba, there is on image called the Niño Futbolista (Child Football/Soccer player) although its real name is "Santo Niño de los Milagros". It is considered to be generous in granting miracles and is in a glass case surrounded by toys given by the faithful to favors received. Every four years, when the FIFA World Cup is played, this image is dressed in the uniform of the Mexico national football team, in the hopes that Mexico wins the cup.

The Santo Niño Doctor de los Enfermos is at a side altar in the parish of San Francisco de Asís en Tepeaca, Puebla. The image is old but devotion to it is relatively recent. The image used to belong to a nun of the Concepción Béistegui Hospital in Mexico City. When the nun was transferred to Tepeaca, she brought the image with her and had it with her as she treated the sick. This image has had its own feast day at this church since 1961 on 30 April.

Other locally famous Niños Dios in Mexico City include the Niño Limosnerito in Colonia Santa Maria la Ribera, the Santo Niño del Verbo Encarnado in Colonia Alfonso XIII, and the Santo Niño Muevo Corazones in Colonia Santa Tomás. This last image is credited with the conversion of many people to Catholicism. Outside of Mexico City, there are the Niño Jesús de la Salud in Morelia, the Niño Milagroso de Tlaxcala, the Niño Cieguito (Blind Child) in Puebla (so called because it lacks eyes) and the Santo Niño de Atocha in Fresnillo, the lasat a local version of a Spanish depiction.

== See also ==
- Il Bambino
- Santo Niño de Cebú
- List of statues of Jesus
