= Chinelos =

Traditional costumed dancer

Chinelos performing at the Expo de los Pueblos Indígenas in Mexico City

Chinelos are a kind of traditional costumed dancer which is popular in the Mexican state of Morelos, parts of the State of Mexico and the Federal District of Mexico City, especially the boroughs of Milpa Alta, Tlalpan, Xochimilco and Magdalena Contreras. The tradition arose from the blending of indigenous and Catholic traditions, most notably Carnival, with its permission to be masked and to mock. Chinelos mock Europeans and European mannerisms from the colonial period up to the end of the 19th century. The Chinelos tradition is strongest in Morelos, especially around Carnival, but Chinelos now appear at other festivities such as Independence Day celebrations, private parties and more.

== History ==
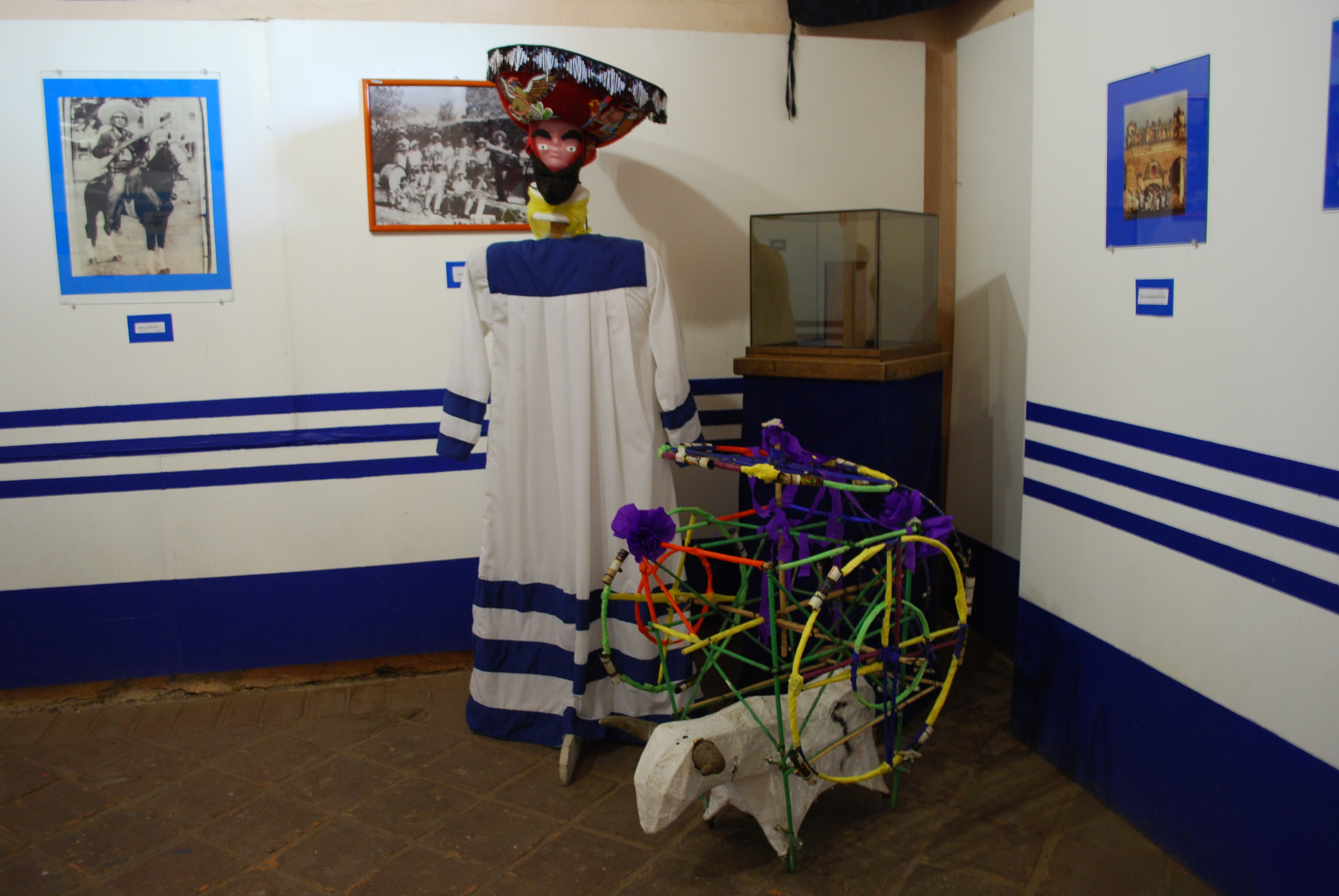
Traditional Tlayacapan Chinelos costume in the La Cereria Museum

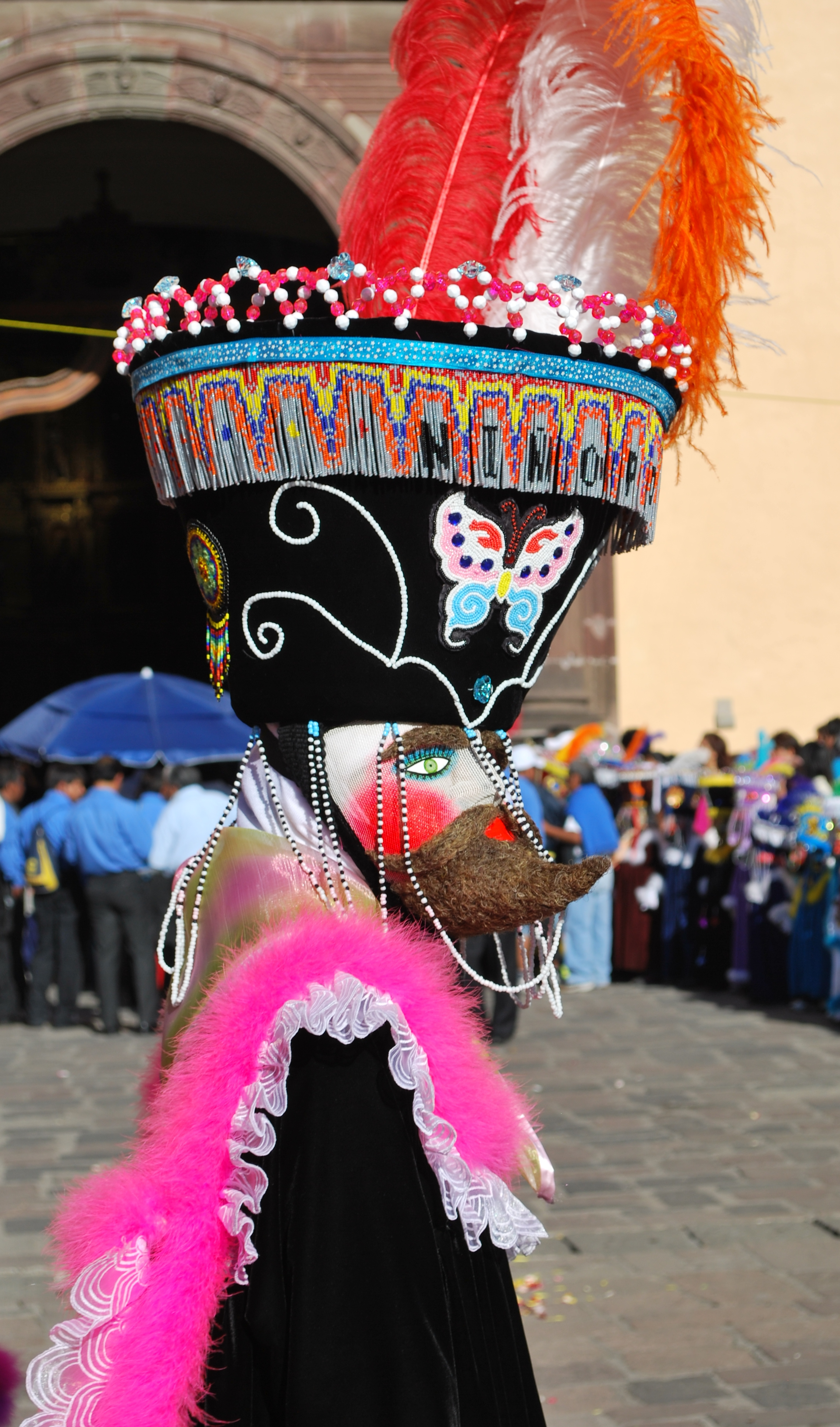
Face of a Chinelos dancer in Xochimilco, Mexico City

The word "chinelos" is derived from the Nahuatl word "zineloquie" which means "disguised." The dance is one of many to develop after the Spanish conquest as native traditions and rites blended into Christian festivals. One of these is Carnival, with its traditions of wearing masks, role reversal, anonymity and behaviors not normally tolerated. This dance developed as a mockery of the Europeans with their fine clothing, beards, fair skin and mannerisms. The modern Chinelos costume began to take shape from between the mid 19th century to the early 20th. The elaborate dress, gloved hands, uptilted beard and arrogant stance also makes fun of the salon dancing of the upper classes during the period of the French intervention as well as Porfirio Díaz’s attempts to “Europeanize” Mexico at the end of the 19th century. The dance developed in the state of Morelos, part of the State of Mexico, part of the Federal District of Mexico City (generally in the south) and even as far as the municipality of Taxco in Guerrero . They are the best known Carnival dancers in Mexico with Morelos having the most groups.

The dance became most developed in the state of Morelos, which in the 19th century was home to a number of sugar cane haciendas which made great fortunes for their owners, but left workers impoverished. Four large municipalities in the state, whose histories extend back to the pre-Hispanic period, are famous for their Chinelos: Tlayacapan, Tepoztlán and Yautepec and Jiutepec. The town of Tlayacapan is probably where the modern format for Chinelo dancing originated. The Chinelos here still perform in the former monastery’s extra large atrium during Carnival.

The Chinelo dancers are now a symbol of the state of Morelos, with the tradition increasing with more towns having dance troupes and it is possible to see troupes dancing at times other than Carnival. It is even possible to hire Chinelos dancers for special occasions. Chinelos are now part of the annual Independence Day celebrations in Cuernavaca . The tradition in Taxco was more popular over a hundred years ago but it has waned. There is still one group with about forty members in a community called Landa. They can be seen associated with the festival associated with Our Lady of Sorrows as well as for Candlemas on February 2.

== Costumes ==
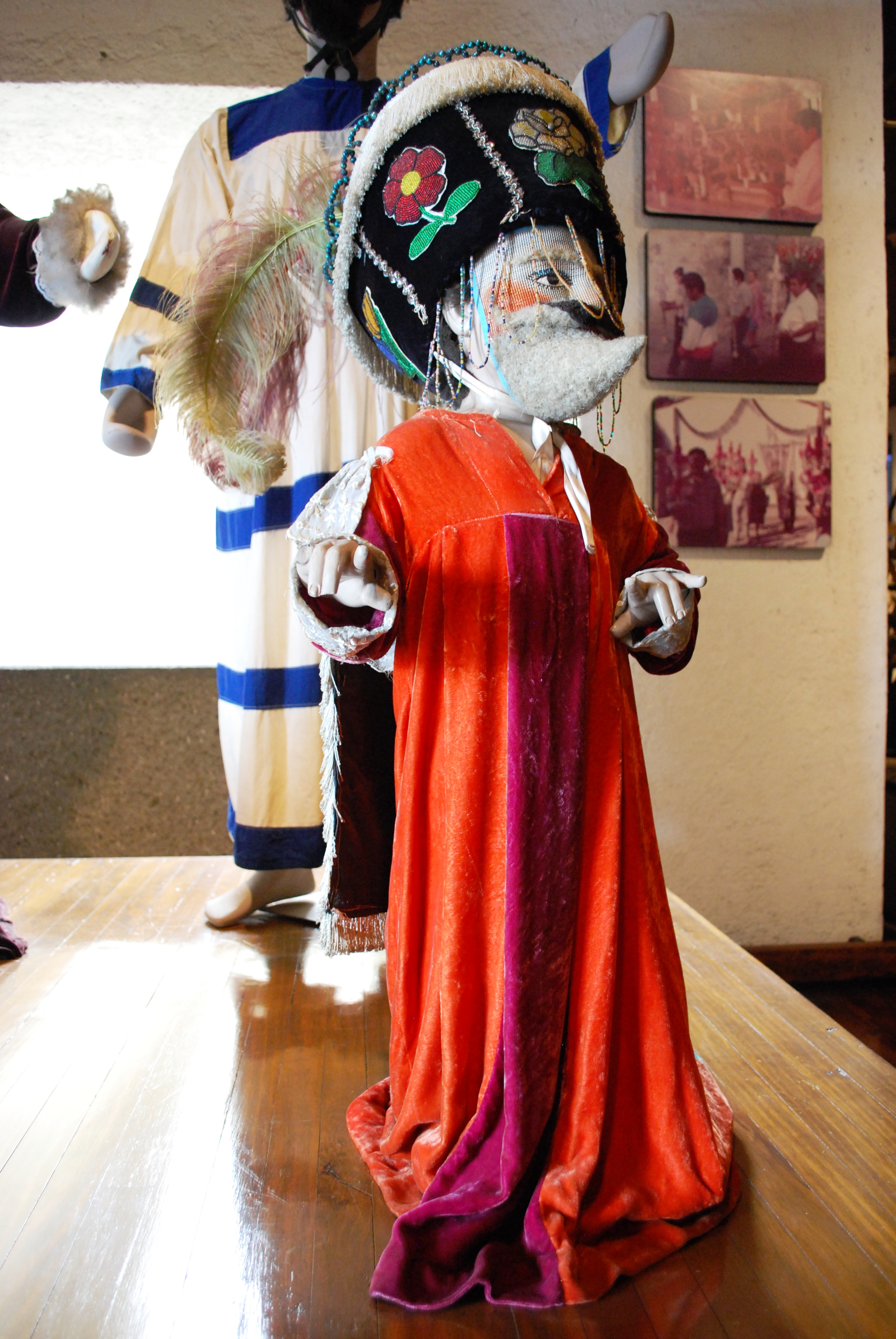
Mannequin dressed as a Chinelo at the Palace of Cortés, Cuernavaca.

The Chinelos costume consists of four main items: a long flowing robe which usually has a rectangular shape tunic, a mask, a large plumed hat, and gloves. The flowing robe and delicate decoration has an almost feminine appearance, making the dancers appear androgynous. These robes are usually made out of velvet. As the robes are extremely hot to dance in, dancers wear bandannas to prevent excessive sweating and dehydration. The Chinelos costume of Tlayacapan is the closest to the original developed in the 19th century. The hat is broader, less embellished with only two or three large feathers. A patterned bandana tied around the head is worn underneath the hat. The tunic is a white robe of white or blue, which is generally not embroidered. The rectangular cape has an image of the Virgin of Guadalupe .

As the tradition spread and developed, especially in Morelos, other towns and groups made distinctive changes to their Chinelos gear and today each town and troupe has its own distinctive elements. This began the process of making extremely elaborate costumes in some places. In Yautepec, the best costumes are made of velvet and are entirely covered in designs and images made from beads, sequins, ribbing and imitation precious stones. These decorative elements can be expensive such as quality beads imported from the Czech Republic . The hats have pre-Hispanic images and modern interpretations of ancient legends. In Tepotzlán, the tunic is made from black velvet and is completely smooth with the image on the back painted on, rather than stitched. The feather decoration in the hat is made of fabric. The hat became higher, straighter and more elaborate, with a black velvet tunic embroidered with sequins.

The Chinelo's masks are made of mesh and always feature an upturned beard and European features. It and the bandana wrapped around the head are essential in keeping Chinelos’ identities secret, something reinforced with the use of gloves on the hands. To further assure anonymity, costumes are closely guarded and kept secret. Members of the troupe dress in different houses to add to the confusion.

The elaborate decorations have made the costumes expensive to make. Prices for making the outfit can range anywhere from 4,000 to 100,000 pesos depending on the complexity of the decoration, the materials used and the time involved. For example, decorations done in beads is more expensive than those in sequins as the beads are smaller. A really elaborate costume can cost up to 2,000 or 400,000 pesos to make. There are now professional Chinelo tunic, mask and hat makers as well as competitions to determine best costume. In Tlayacapan there are at least eight families that dedicated themselves full-time to making the gear. José Salazar Flores of Tepotzlán makes his living making nothing but Chinelo hats. These hats alone can cost anywhere from 12,000 to 30,000 pesos and take about forty days each. The hat is made from fabric with frame made from palm leaves. The costumes worn at previous Carnivals or other occasions can fetch up to 100,000 pesos from collectors.

== Performances ==
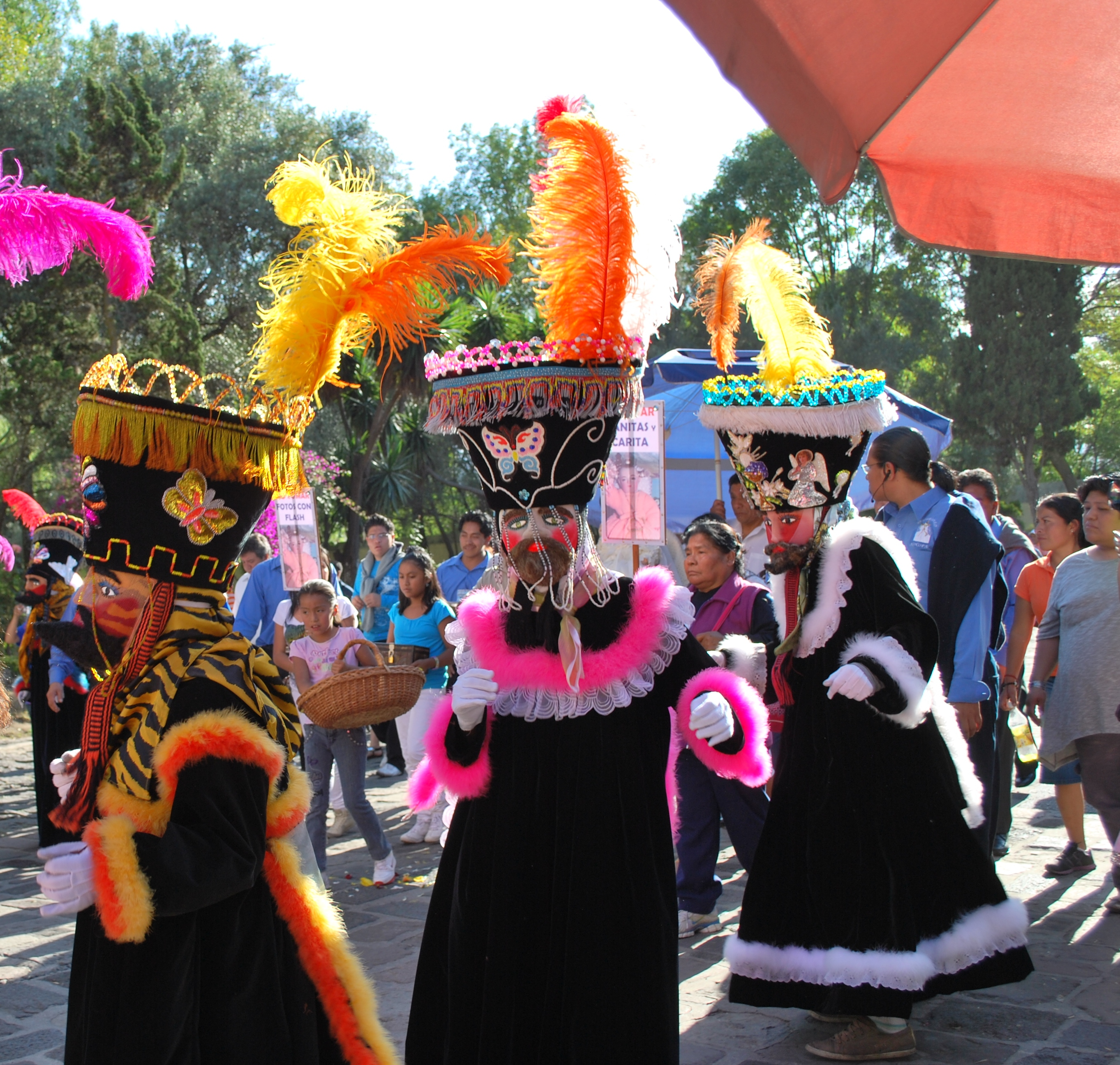
Chinelos in procession with the "Niñopa" image in Xochimilco

The dance, literally called a “brincon” or “jump” is a set of repetitive steps. The choreography is very simple. With feet apart and knees slightly bent, the dancers take two shuffling steps, then leading with one shoulder or the other, take a small jump to the right or left. Dancers join in and drop out for longer events but the group dances as long as the band plays. Most Chinelos dancers are young men as it is tiring and the costumes can be suffocating. The role of a Chinelo dancer is passed on from parents to children. On some occasions children dance on a different day than their parents.

Most traditionally, Chinelos dance for Carnival, with events beginning as early as the last weekend of January and different towns take turns on the following weekends until Lent begins. The dances take place on the weekends between mid afternoon on Fridays until late evening on Sundays. The dancers are always accompanied by a brass band. The music is most traditional at the Carnival of Tlayacapan, which also gave rise to the Banda de Musica Santa Maria de Tlayacapan, the best known musical group of Morelos.

In the boroughs of Milpa Alta and Xochimilco, there is no important festival without the participation of these dancers. The dancers also accompany the celebrated “Niñopa” image during its many processions and festivities in its honor during the year.
