= Juan Esquivel y Fuentes =

Mexican poet and priest (1869–1955)

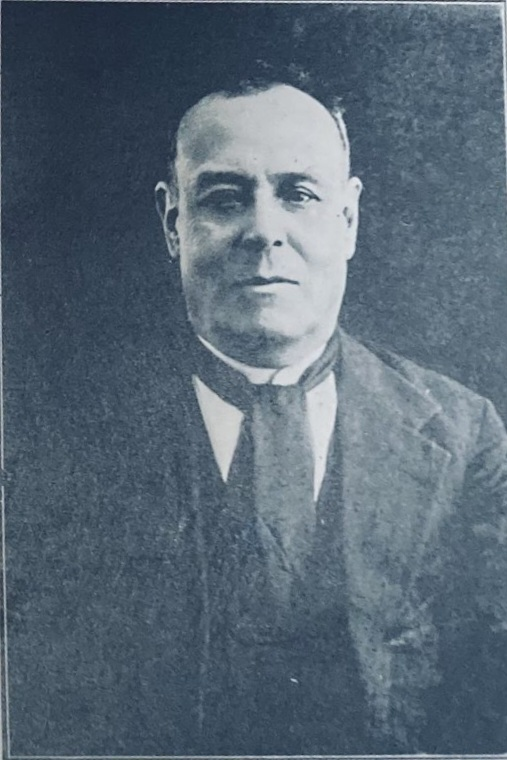
- Juan Esquivel y Fuentes in 1932
- Born: Juan Esquivel y Fuentes; 27 December 1869; Tepepan, Mexico
- Died: c. 1955; Cuauhtémoc, Mexico City, Mexico
- Education: Seminario Conciliar de México; Universidad Pontificia de México (Doctorate)
- Occupations: Writer; Priest; School teacher; Public Speaker
- Parent: Sóstenes Fuentes
- Writing career
- Years active: 1932–1955
- Period: Modern (20th century)
- Genres: Poetry
- Subjects: Rural life, nostalgia, unrequited love, young love, God and religion, Jesus Christ's life, nature's beauty.
- Notable works: Tepepam, poesías (1st to 8th ed., 1932-1955)
- Literary movement: Modernismo

Signature
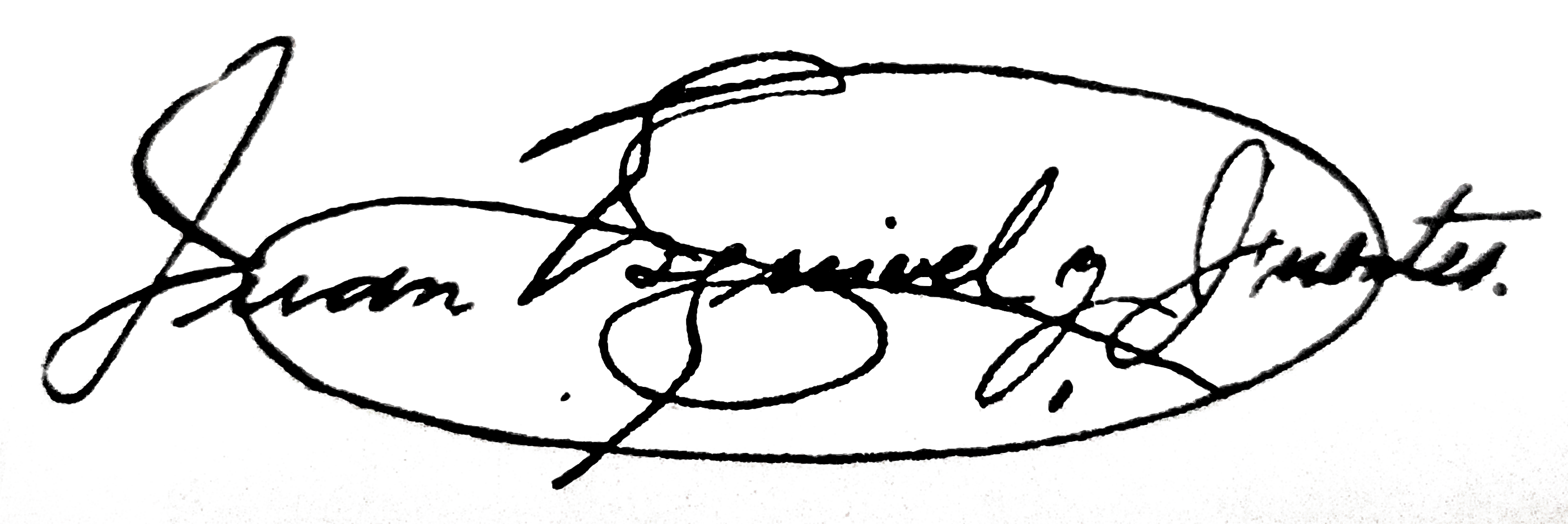

Juan Esquivel y Fuentes (27 December 1869–c. 1955) was a Mexican poet, priest and public speaker from the town of Santa María Tepepan, in what is today the Mexico City's borough of Xochimilco. He was better known for his poetry collection called "Tepepam, Poesías", on which he worked from 1932 until his death in 1955, constantly adding new poems, deleting older ones and frequently changing the structure and contents of the others throughout the eight published editions. During his life he taught math at the Seminario Conciliar de México and traveled to the Levant, Egypt and Europe as a preacher and public speaker.

By the end of his life he had gained a bit of notoriety in Mexico City's literary and artistic circle, getting his autobiography (written in poetic prose) published by the literature anthology magazine América (where other important authors like Rosario Castellanos had their works published) by the suggestion of the Mexican painter and illustrator Eduardo Cataño and his wife Margarita Michelena, editors of the magazine, even receiving the epithet of "The Mexican Virgil" by the XX^{th} century Mexican chronicler of Xochimilco, Santos Acevedo López y De La Cruz.

After his death his work fell into obscurity; although the library at Santa María Tepepan was named after him.

== Sources ==
- Esquivel y Fuentes, Juan (1932–55). Tepepam, Poesías [Tepepam, poems] (in Spanish) (1-8 ed.). Mexico City.
- Esquivel y Fuentes, Juan (March 1953). Guzmán Araujo, Roberto; Millán, Marco Antonio; Hernández, Efrén; et al. (eds.). "Tepepam y mi vida" [Tepepam and my life]. América, Revista Antológica (in Spanish). No. 68. México, D.F.: Secretaría de Educación Pública. Departamento de Divulgación. pp. 47–60. ISSN 0185-6928.
