= Santa María Tepepan =

Original town in the borough of Xochimilco in Mexico City

Santa María Tepepan Tepepan (Nahuatl)
- Town and Neighbourhood
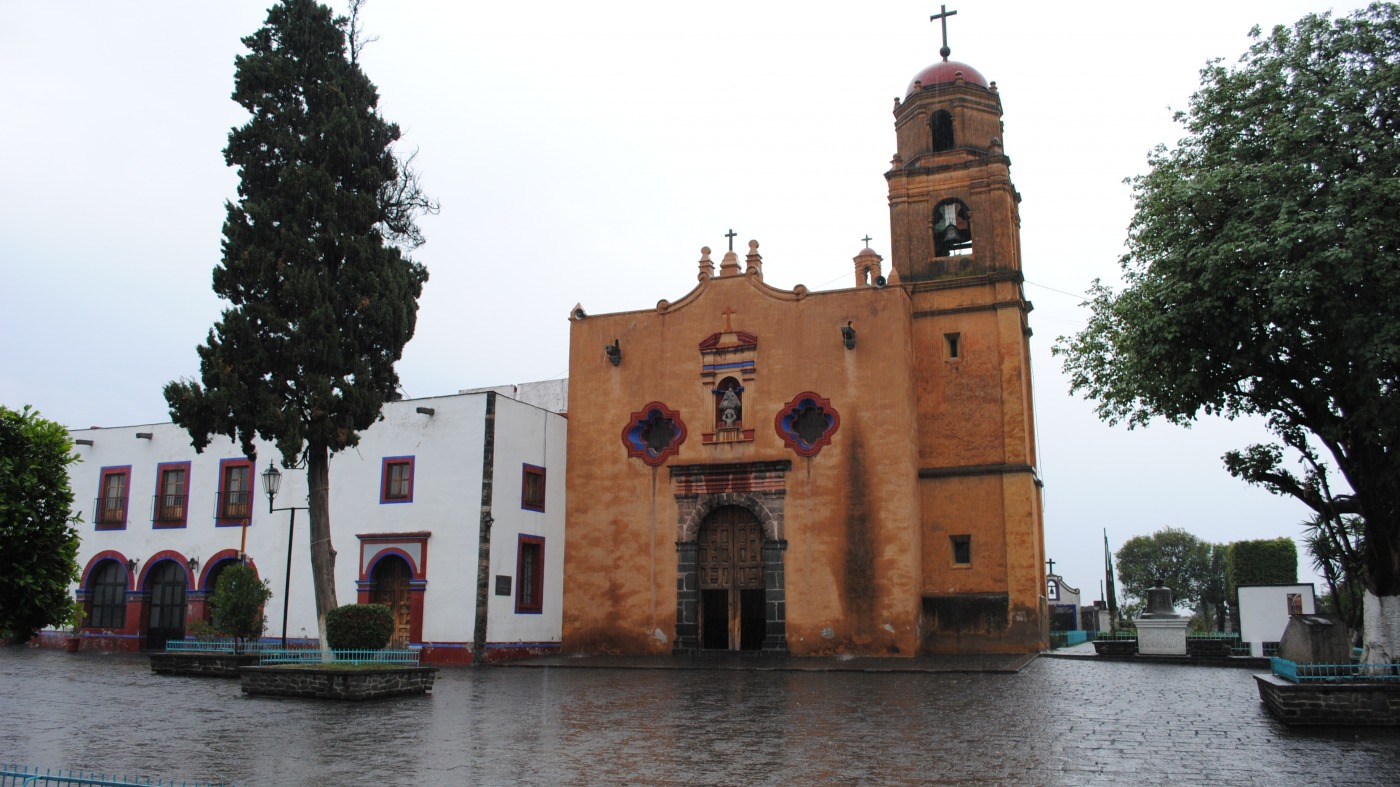
- Santa María de la Visitación ("St. Mary of the Visitation"), local church of Santa María Tepepan
- Etymology: From the Nahuatl Tepetl ("Hill") and Ipan ("On something","Above something")
- Location of Santa María Tepepan within Mexico City Santa María Tepepan (Mexico)
- Coordinates: 19°16′26″N 99°08′11″W
- Country: Mexico
- Federal entity: Mexico City
- Borough: Xochimilco
- Founded: Sometime between 1526 and 1565
- Founder: Pedro de Gante
- Named for: Either a purported Tonantzin shrine or settlement built on top of the hill.

Area
  - Total: 2.6 km^{2} (1.0 sq mi)
- Elevation: 2,380 m (7,810 ft)
- Postal Code: 16020

Santa María Tepepan (Spanish: Pueblo de Santa María Tepepan) is one of the 14 recognized original pueblos ("towns" or "townships") that form the Mexico City borough of Xochimilco. It sits on the lower edges of the mountain chain that limits Mexico City to the south. Although it is in Mexico City's territory, it conserves a lot of rural characteristics, like winding cobblestone streets, and economic activities, equestrianism being one of the most important ones until recently.

Its church, called Santa María de la Visitación ("Holy Mary of the Visitation"), dates to the seventeenth century, although it was rebuilt in the nineteenth century, and was raised on top of the original shrine built in the XVI^{th} century when the town was founded; which, in turn, allegedly sat above a pre-Hispanic shrine to the Aztec goddess Tonantzin. The adjacent monastery was built between 1612 and 1627 by the friar Juan de Lazcano.

== Geography ==
Tepepan is found on the southern region of Mexico City, in the northwestern part of the borough of Xochimilco, at its western border with the borough of Tlalpan. It is located in the northern skirt of the Ajusco-Chichinauhtzin mountain chain that borders Mexico City to its south. More specifically, it is located in the skirts of the Xochitepec Hill, which is part of this mountain chain. It has a highland subhumid temperate climate according to the Köppen climate classification (Cwb). Tepepan has several water springs around it that historically fed the ancient Lake Xochimilco and are now used for Mexico City's water distribution system.

== Toponym ==
Like many places in Mexico, the name "Santa María Tepepan" originates from two disparate sources due to the Conquista. The first part comes from the Spanish catholic tradition, and the second from the pre-Hispanic nahuatl term for the area.

The first part of the name (Santa María) refers to Nuestra Señora Santa María de los Remedios, which is the patron saint of the town. This name was given to the town at its founding when, according to its founding myth, an icon of the Virgen de los Remedios, made by the instruction of Pedro de Gante for the Convent of Mexico and then moved to Xochimilco, was finally deposited by him in the original shrine built in the place where the modern church stands today. Some sources indicate that this original stone icon is the same one that can be seen today inside the modern church.

The second part of the name comes from the nahuatl "Tepepan", which is an agglutination of the nahuatl noun "Tepetl" which means "Hill" and the postposition "Ipan", which can be translated as the English prepositions "on something", "above something", and more importantly for this case, "on top of something". This results in "Tepepan", meaning "On top of the hill", in reference to either a purported shrine to Tonantzin that sat on top of the hill on which the modern church stands today, or a pre-Hispanic settlement in the general vicinity. It seems that the original pre-Hispanic settlement of Tepepan, and the general area around it, was given this fairly generic name for being the first settlement on the path of Mexico-Tenochtitlan's southern expansion to be found on top of a hill, just as Tlalpan was given its name for being the first settlement to the south of Tenochtitlan to be raised on solid ground.

== History ==
=== Pre-colonial era ===
Very little is known about Tepepan before the Spanish conquest. There are no contemporaneous pre-Hispanic primary sources that mention it. However, there is some archeological evidence showing scant and disperse habitation of the general area of Tepepan by various cultures before the Spanish colonization.

==== Pre-classical period ====
A few archeological artifacts dating to the pre-classical period have been found in Tepepan. These are common household items for the cultures that inhabited the area at the time, like molcajetes and flattening tools made from tezontle, dated to sometime before 1000 B.C.E. It is likely that these artifacts correspond one or more of the pre-classical cultures that inhabited the Valley of Mexico, like the Cuicuilco culture, the Tlatilco culture or the Copilco culture.

==== Classical period ====
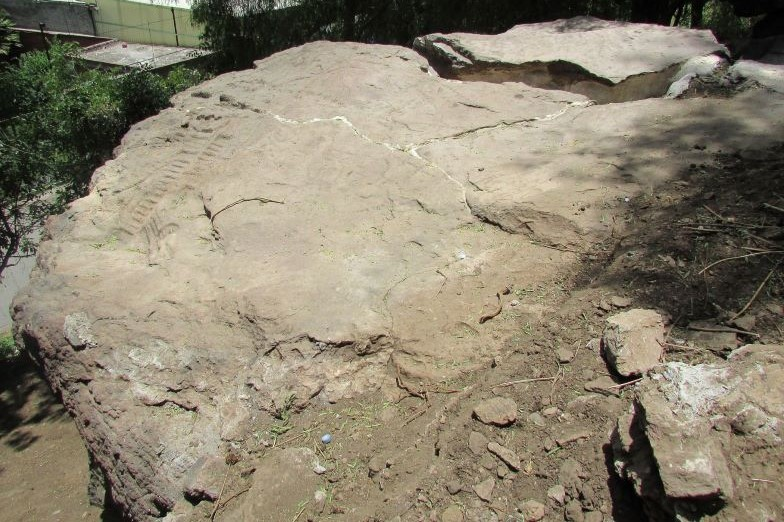
Stone map (Nahualapa) form the archeological site of Cuahilama

Coming as part of the first nahua migration, the predecessors of the Xochimilca arrived at what today is Xochimilco, near the town of Cuahilama. When they arrived the area has inhabited by Tlahuica tribes, which went to war against the newly arrived proto-Xochimilca. The predecessors of the Xochimilca were defeated and they retreated from Cuahilama into Xochitepec, near Tepepan, in the year of 1194, establishing some settlements in the area.

Pottery pieces corresponding to both late Teotihuacan culture and Toltec culture have been found in the vicinity of Tepepan. A copy of the map stone (Nahualapa) of the archeological site of Cuahilama, has also been found in Tepepan, dating from sometime in the Late Classical period, between 1196 and 1265 C.E., corresponding to the early Xochimilcans.

All of these and the pre-Hispanic artifacts are housed today at the Archeological Museum of Xochimilco in Santa Cruz Acalpixca.

==== Post-classical period ====
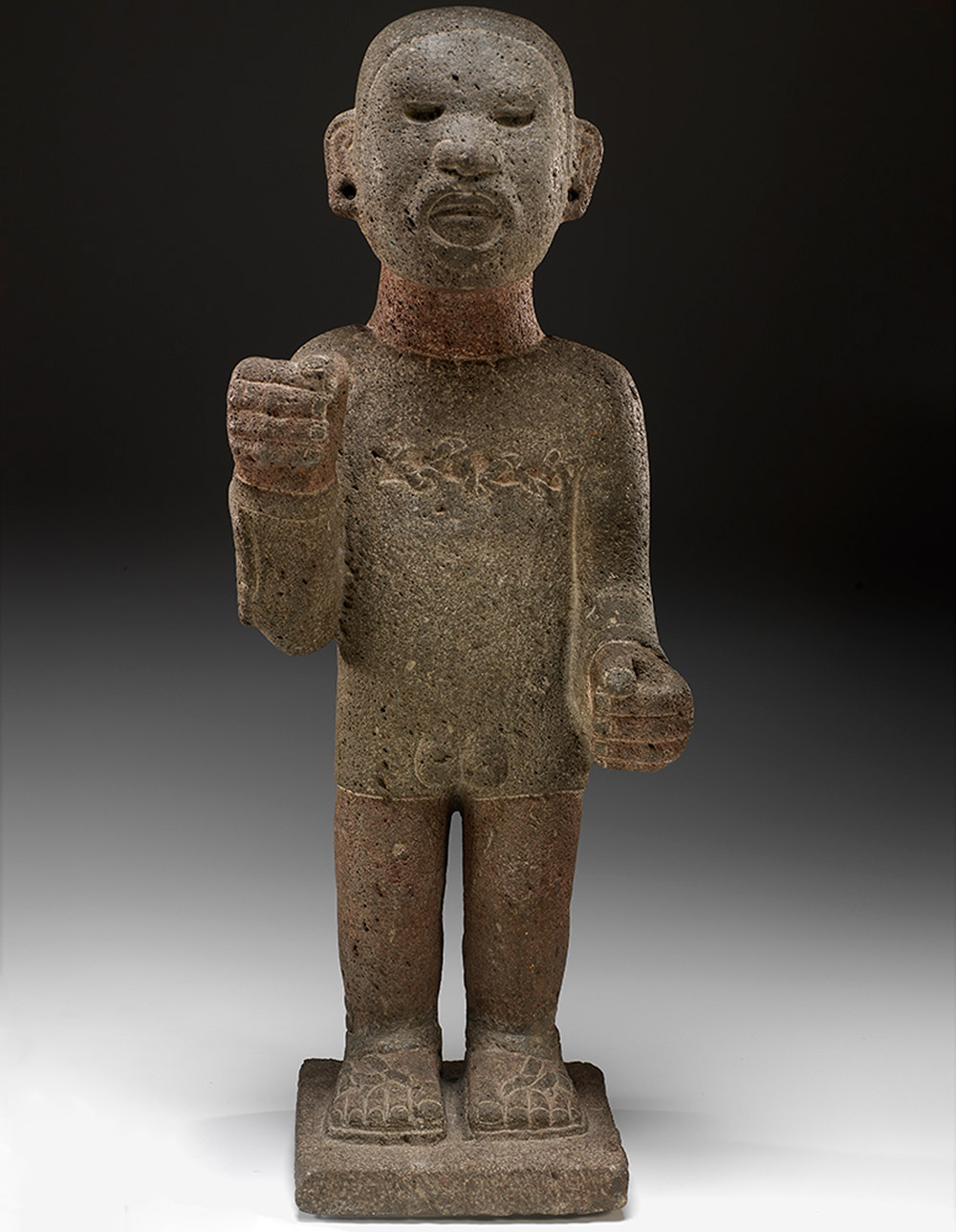
Front

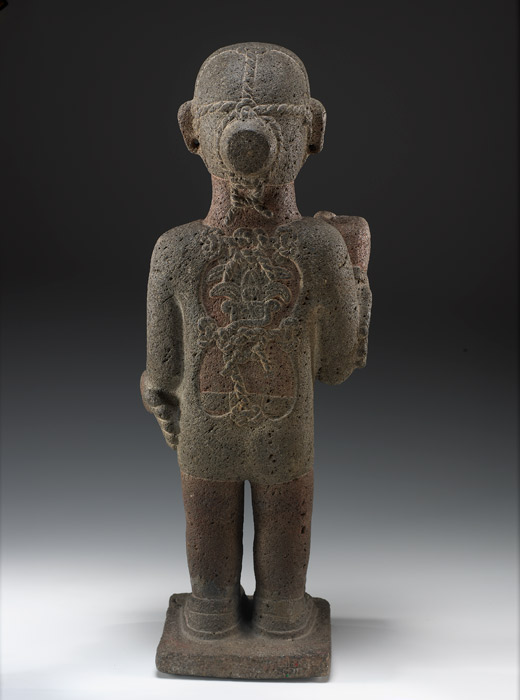
Back

Statue of Xipe Totec found in Tepepan, housed at the National Museum of the American Indian

Tepepan was under the control of the Xochimilca Altepetl, until the entire Xochimilca population and settlements were subdued by the Mexicas under Acamapichtli's rule, fifty-six years after Tenochtitlan's founding (around 1381 C.E.). Tepepan is not mentioned in the Codex Mendoza, while both its neighbors, Xochimilco and Tlalpan are. This indicates that, at the time, Tepepan probably had either a low density rural settlement, or was too small to be counted as separate from its neighbors.

Archeological artifacts found in Tepepan from this period include statues representing Aztec warriors, a statue of the goddess Chantico, pottery pieces, and incense burners, indicating the presence of some type of settlement in the general area. The most important finding of this period is a basalt statue of the god Xipe Totec currently housed at the National Museum of the American Indian. This god was commonly venerated in rural communities for its association with agriculture. The statue represents the standing Flayed God using its flayed skin as a mask and suit, tying it with a chord at the back. It has the date "2 Ācatl" (2 reed) from the Tōnalpōhualli calendar, which is associated to the New Fire ceremony, dating the statue to February or March of 1507.

==== Tonantzin Shrine ====
Various official government sources state that there was a shrine for the Aztec goddess Tonantzin in what is today the location of the church of Santa María de la Visitación. According to these sources, the location is special because during the winter solstice the sun can be seen raising from the Teuhtli volcano's crater (or even the crater of the Popocatepetl) and setting at the Pico del Águila, two culturally significant places for the Aztecs and Xochimilcas. However, while the description of this cosmological phenomenon is true and can be observed today, there is very little material evidence to substantiate the claim that there was a shrine to the goddess Tonantzin at that exact location. There are no contemporary accounts that indicate the existence of the shrine, neither from Aztec or Xochimilca sources, nor from Spanish friar chroniclers. There is also no archeological evidence of such a structure existing before the arrival of the Spaniards, although there haven't been any excavations, active dig sites nor any proposed plans to unearth evidence of said structure from under the church. All evidence for the existence of the Tonantzin shrine is circumstantial, based on the cosmological phenomenon mentioned above, the particular orientation of the convent (being located north of the church, instead of the more standard south positioning), the common practice of many Spanish missionaries of raising churches on top of existing indigenous temples and shrines, and the fact that the toponym "Tepepan" had been used for the area before the arrival of the Spaniards, indicating the existence of some settlement or known construction in its location.

=== 16th century ===
==== Founding ====
There are conflicting accounts about Tepepan's founding. According to official sources, a monument outside the church of Santa María de la Visitación and a painting of Pedro de Gante inside the church's convent, Tepepan was founded in 1526 when, by instruction of Pedro de Gante, a shrine was built to house an icon of Nuestra Señora Santa María de los Remedios that was originally made for the Convent of Mexico. It is said that Pedro de Gante took some people from Xochimilco to live on top of the hill where Tepepan sits today, teaching them to work with stone and clay, building the shrine for the icon and by doing so, founding the town. However, there is no recorded evidence from this period to confirm this event occurring in 1526.

According to internal records of the Parish of Santa María Tepepan, the icon was already in Tepapan by 1548. There is also a papal brief issued by Pope Clement VIII and first read on the 4 of July 1596 in Puebla, that mentions Tepepan's shrine and its icon, and states that it was well-known and frequented by the locals. These two sources show that Tepepan's shrine, but not the church, was built some time in the early to mid-sixteenth century, although neither gives a specific date nor do they indicate the existence of a town (or lack thereof) around the shrine at the time.

The first recorded telling of Tepepan's founding appears in Franciscan friar chronicler Agustín de Vetancurt's Chronica de la Provincia del Santo Evangelio de México: Quarta Parte del Teatro Mexicano de los Successos Religiosos, published in 1697, a whole century after Tepepan was mentioned in Pope Clement VIII's brief. He also associates the depositing of the icon in the shrine with the town's founding:

Vn trasumpto de la Virgen de los Remedios hizo el V. P. Fr. Pedro de Gante de vna piedra de la cantera de los Remedios [...]; pusola en el Convento de Mexico, de donde fue llevada a Xochimilco [...]; de alli en la fundacion de Tepepam [sic] cercano al de Xochimilco se colocò [sic] aquesta Imagen [...].
An icon of the Virgin of the Remedies was made by the V. F. Fr. Pedro de Gante from a stone from the quarry of the Remedies [...]; he deposited it in the Convent of Mexico, from where it was taken to Xochimilco [...]; from there, on Tepepam's [sic] founding, near Xochimilco, that Icon was deposited [...].

— Agustín de Vetancurt, Chronica de la Provincia del Santo Evangelio de México p.t.5, p.132

However, he does not give any dates, neither for the depositing of the icon nor for the town's founding. Furthermore, he tells a different story earlier in the text, narrating that the town was built in one night and day by the people of Xochimilco to stop New Spain's viceroy "Luis de Velasco" from using the land for cattle grazing, fearing that the cattle could damage crops and contaminate the water, for he could not use the land if it was already inhabited:

Fundose el Pueblo en tiempo del Señor D. Luis de Velasco, con ocasión de que se hizo merced del sitio para ganado mayor, replicaron los de Xochimilco, y sabiendo que solo con aver Pueblo se podia estorvar, en vna noche y dia le poblaron de casas, sementeras de mays en cespedes, y puesta campana en la hermita, con dos Religiosos no tuvo lugar la merced del sitio.
The town was founded in the time of sir D. Luis de Velasco, with the occasion of him being granted the land for cattle grazing, the people of Xochimilco replied, and knowing that by only having a Town there they could get in his way, in one night and day they populated it with houses, seedbeds of corn in fields, and by hanging a bell in the shrine, with two clergymen, the land could not be granted.

— Agustín de Vetancurt, Chronica de la Provincia del Santo Evangelio de México p.t.2, p.86

By its wording, this last quote seems to imply that the shrine preceded the town's founding (not mentioning it as something that the townspeople built, but only stating that they hung a bell in it) and that the area wasn't densely settled before, considering it was granted as land for cattle grazing. Although, again, Agustín de Vetancurt does not provide any dates for the narrated events.

However, a severe chronological problem arises from this narration: namely, that there were two viceroys of New Spain with the same name: Luis de Velasco, the second viceroy, who governed from November 1550 to June 1564; and his homonymous son Luis de Velasco, the eighth viceroy, who governed from January 1590 to November 1595 and from July 1607 to June 1611. Agustín de Vetancurt doesn't specify which one of the two Viceroys was granted the land, so the year in which the town was founded could lie sometime in between 1550 and 1611 when either Luis Velasco was governing, which is a very wide window of time in which the town could have been founded.

Some authors have concluded, based on the information provided by the few documents that mention Tepepan from this period, that the shrine was built first, before the town existed, sometime in the early to mid-sixteenth century or even under the government of Luis Velasco Sr., and that the town was raised later to protect the lands surrounding the shrine from the grant given to Luis Velasco Jr. And by hanging a bell in the already existing shrine, the town could be consolidated as such by having a proper church with bells, instead of a shrine.

=== 17th century ===
Whether the town of Tepepan's founding occurred as early as of 1526 or as late as of 1599, by the year of 1609 it is mentioned in the Relación de los conventos fransiscanos del año de 1609 ("List of Franciscan convents of the year 1609"), explicitly stating the existence of the town and of a convent inhabited by two or three priests. By 1623, the church of Tepepan was the head church of the area having seven towns under its lead, making it a very important parish south of Mexico City.

==== Autonomy and growth ====
In 1652 Santa María Tepepan became autonomous from Xochimilco after the inhabitants revolted against the city's authorities. This came about after the hacendados of Xochimilco started to take people form Tepepan to work the fields as slaves, without any pay. After the protests Tepepan was granted autonomy and the right to choose its mayors and to self-govern, an autonomy which it would maintain until the XIX^{th} century, when Xochimilco became a bourough of Mexico City and Tepepan was included within its final territory and jurisdiction.

This newfound autonomy coincided with the growth of the town itself. At this point in time the town was big enough to be divided in eight different neighbourhoods, with two additional chapels around town (neither of which exist today). By the time Agustín de Vetancurt wrote his Chronica, in 1697, there were three hundred people living in Tepepan, twelve of which were Spaniards and the rest Indians, and it had two haciendas (estates) in which the natives worked growing corn and wheat.

One of the main drivers of the town's growth was the cult of the Virgen de los Remedios icon. However, because of the competing cult of the Virgin of Guadalupe, which had gained a lot more popularity with the indigenous population who saw the Spanish Virgin of the Remedies as a religious rival of the Mexican Virgin of Guadalupe, there were some disputes with the neighbouring towns and settlements. To stop the disputes, around 1644 the church changed its patron saint to the neutral Virgin Mary, Our Lady of the Visitation and an image of the Virgin of Guadalupe was included inside the church, but the original icon of the Virgin of the Remedies was kept. To house the icon and to have a pilgrimage site for the cult of the Virgin of the Remedies, a new church of Santa María de la Visitación and a convent were built, starting sometime after 1653 and finishing by 1697, mainly under the supervision of friar Fransisco Millan, and by 1691 it was important enough to be designated as a general vicarage. This is the same church that still stands today.

=== 18th and 19th centuries ===
By the beginning of the 18th century Tepepan was a commonly visited stop between Mexico, Tlalpan and Xochimilco, both because of its geographical location and because of the pilgrimage to the church of Santa María de la Visitación, even appearing on maps of the Valley of Mexico. However, by the middle of this century Tepepan lost its relevance. Based on some documents of the time, this could be because there were problems between the Franciscan friars and the land owners that controlled the estates of La Noria and San Juan de Dios; problems that affected the inhabitants of the town, stunting its development. Because the friars wanted to prohibit the indigenous customs still practiced by Tepepan's population, the land owners primed the workers against them to gain influence over the people and the land, making it harder for the church to be maintained, which caused the mandatory church tariffs paid by the inhabitants to be raised in response, which in turn stopped the growth of Tepepan because the higher tariffs made it less attractive for people to move into it. This could also have been caused by the parallel growth of Xochimilco and Tlalpan, both of which, being bigger population centers, took away from Tepepan's relevance.

By the beginning of the 19th century Tepepan had lost all of its past relevance and was just another town in the area. Not much is known about the town during this period, nor after the Mexican War of Independence, other than the fact that the main economic activity of the town changed from agriculture to horse and cattle raising. There are some myths that tell how José María Morelos, the Mexican Independence hero, stopped in Tepepan in his way to San Cristobal Ecatepec for his execution; but there are no contemporary primary sources nor reliable secondary sources to back this up.

After Mexico became independent, control over Tepepan changed constantly between Tlalpan and Xochimilco because the political demarcations of these municipalities themselves were subject of constant change. It was until 1861, when president Benito Juárez defined the municipalities of Mexico City and their territories, that Tepepan finally came to be under the control of Xochimilco, under which it remains today; although it is geographically closer to Tlalpan's center rather than Xochimilco's center. This was reaffirmed in 1903 when president Porfirio Díaz split the municipalities into smaller boroughs, giving the borough of Xochimilco its current territory, which still included Tepepan.

=== 20th and 21st centuries ===
Little changed in Tepepan after the Mexican Revolution, although the estates were converted into ejidos, controlled by the workers instead of the landowners. The main economic activity of the town remained horse and cattle raising.

After the 1985 Mexico City earthquake, the previously rural areas around Mexico City began urbanizing due to the migration of city dwellers away from the city center into less populated areas. This migration was greater in volume for boroughs like Milpa Alta, Tlahuac, Tlalpan and Xochimico, and it caused the growth of the town of Tepepan after more than two centuries of stagnation. This was mainly because Tepapan is one of the most accessible towns of Xochimilco, being situated next to two important roads in Mexico City: Anillo Periférico and Calzada Mexico-Xochimilco, which connects to the Calzada de Tlalpan. It also has quick access to two stations of the Mexico City Light Rail line: "Tepepan" and "Periférico/Participación Ciudadana". Because of its ease of access for both car traffic and public transport, Tepepan grew faster than other towns in Xochimilco. This urbanization has caused a loss of character of the town, changing from a rural town focused in horse and cattle raising to a mainly suburban residential area.

Because of this growth, new settlements and neighbourhoods have been given the name of "Tepepan", some of them in Xochimilco, others in Tlalpan. There is also a prison/hospital that has the name "Tepepan": Centro Femenil de Readaptación Social (Tepepan) (Center of Social Readaptation for Women (Tepepan)), although it is not located in a neighbourhood named after "Tepepan".

==== List of neighbourhoods named after Tepepan ====
- Ampliación Tepepan - Xochimilco
- Ejidos de Tepepan - Xochimilco
- Fuentes de Tepepan - Tlalpan
- La Noria Tepepan -Xochimilco
- Pedregal de Tepepan - Tlalpan
- San Juan de Tepepan -Xochimilco
- Santa María Tepepan - Xochimilco
- Valle de Tepepan - Tlalpan

== Archeological findings ==
Some pre-Hispanic archeological remains have been unearthed in Tepepan over the years, and during the construction of the modern church some pottery pieces and Aztec idols were discovered. However, the only recorded instance of an excavation under the church occurred when the old wooden floor of the only nave was replaced with marble tiling, in 1947, during which twenty mummies where unearthed. All of them where from the colonial period; some of them where of Franciscan friars and nuns, and one of them was of Meztlixochitl, the wife of Apochquiyauhtzin, the last Tlatoani and first cacique of Xochimilco.

== Notable people ==
Juan Esquivel y Fuentes: Mexican 20th century poet, priest and public speaker known for his poetry collection Tepepam: Poesías. The public library in Santa Maria Tepepan is named after him.
