= Xochimilco (altepetl) =

Pre-Columbian city-state

- c. 900–1521
- Xochimilco's Aztec glyph

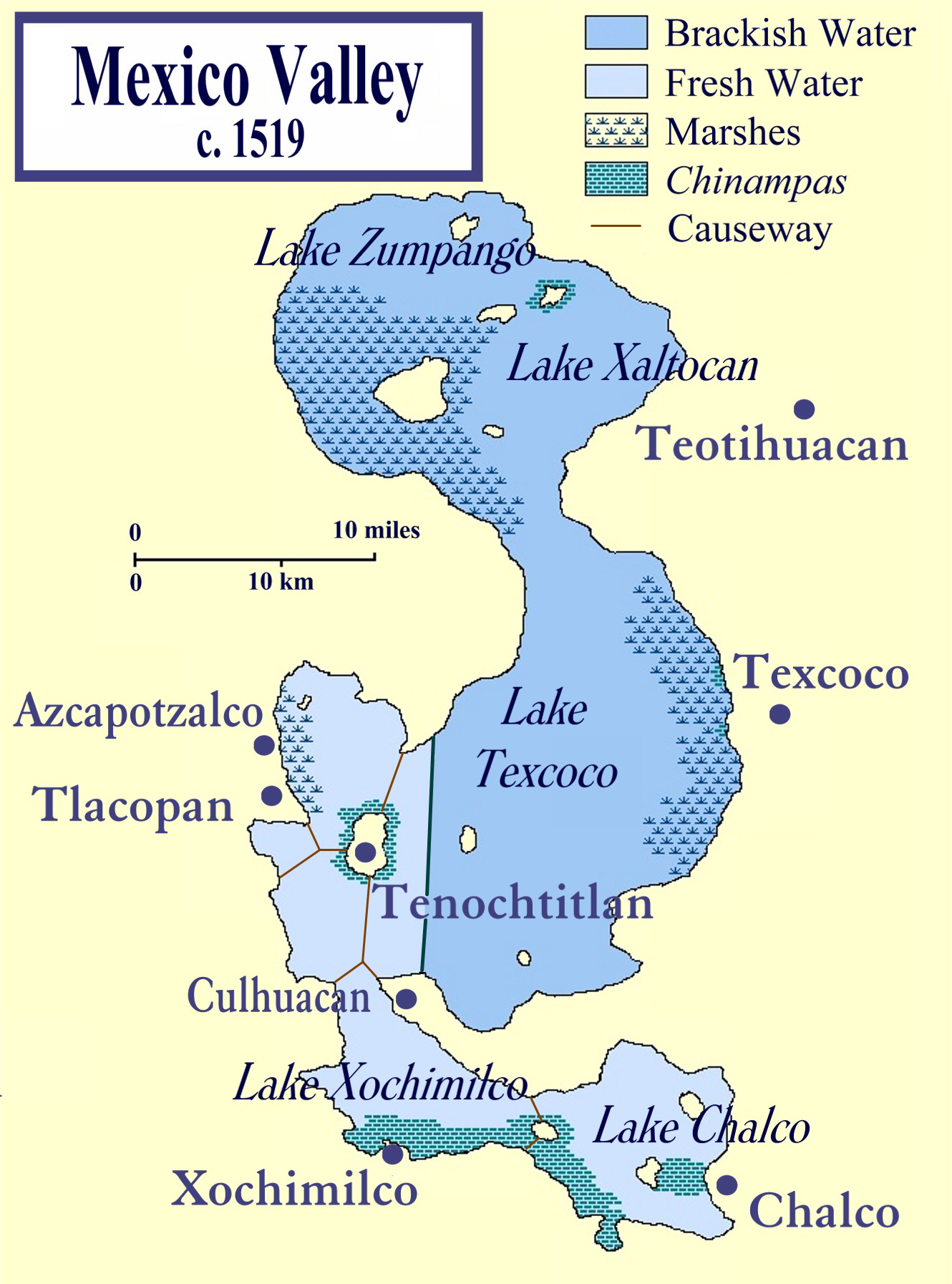
- The Valley of Mexico at the time of the Spanish conquest showing the location of lake Xochimilco.
- Capital: Xochimilco
- Common languages: Classical Nahuatl
- Religion: Pre-Columbian Nahua religion, with Quilaztli (Cihuacoatl) and Chantico being the most important cults
- Government: Monarchy
- Historical era: Pre-Columbian
  - Established: c. 900
  - Spanish conquest of the Aztec Empire: 1521
Succeeded by
New Spain

Xochimilco (Otomian languages: Amatönmahuãhi) was the most important city of the Xochimilca people, one of the Nahua tribes that migrated to the Mesoamerica region. At the same time it was the name of the altepetl of this group and historically referred to both interchangebly. The city was founded around 900 AD. It grew to become an important city in the Valley of Mexico, until in 1430, the Mexica of Tenochtitlan succeeded in conquering the city.

== Etymology ==
The name “Xochimilco” comes from Nahuatl and means “flower field.” This referred to the many flowers and other crops that were grown here on chinampas since the pre-Hispanic period.

== History ==
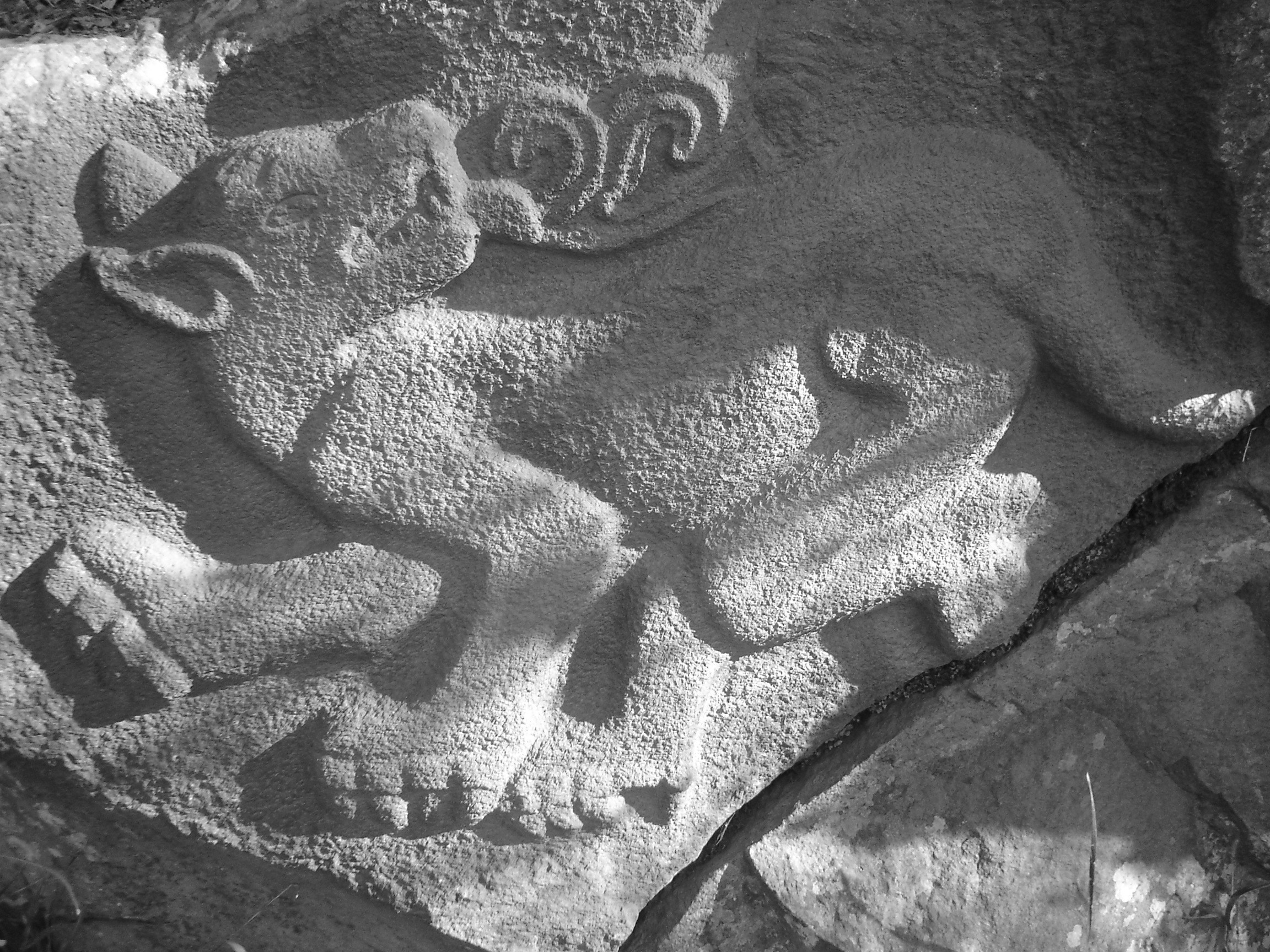
Petroglyph at Cuauhilama

The first human presence in the area was of hunter gatherers, who eventually settled into farming communities. The first settlements in the Xochimilco area were associated with the Cuicuilco, Copilco and Tlatilco settlements during the Classic period. The Xochimilca people, considered to be one of the seven tribes that migrated into the Valley of Mexico from Chicomoztoc, first settled around 900 CE in Cuahilama, near what is now Santa Cruz Acalpixca. They worshipped sixteen deities, with Chantico, goddess of the hearth and Cihuacoatl, an earth goddess and Amimitl, god of chinampas the most important. Although Nahuatl was the main language, there was an Otomi minority.

The Xochimilcas were farmers and founded their first dominion under a leader named Acatonallo. He is credited for inventing the chinampa system of agriculture in order to increase production. These chinampas eventually became the main producer with crops such as corn, beans, chili peppers, squash and more. The city of Xochimilco was founded in 919. Over time, it grew and began to dominate other areas on the south side of the lakes such as Mixquic, Tláhuac, Culhuacan and even parts of what is now the State of Morelos. Xochimilco had one woman ruler, which did not happen anywhere else in Mesoamerica in the pre-Hispanic period. She is credited with adding a number of distinctive dishes to the area’s cuisine, with inclusions such as necuatolli, chileatolli (atole with chili pepper), esquites and tlapiques.

In 1352, then emperor Caxtoltzin moved the city from the mainland to the island of Tlilan. In this respect it was like another island city in the area, Tenochtitlan. Although no longer an island, the city center is still in the same spot. In 1376, Tenochtitlan attacked Xochimilco, forcing the city to appeal to Azcapotzalco for help. The conquest was unsuccessful, but Xochimilco was then forced to pay tribute to Azcapotzalco. Tenochtitlan succeeded in conquering Xochimilco in 1430, while it was ruled by Tzalpoyotzin. Shortly thereafter, Aztec emperor Itzcoatl built the causeway or calzada that would connect the two cities over the lake. During the reign of Moctezuma Ilhuicamina, the Xochimilcas contributed materials and manpower to construct a temple to Huitzilopochtli. They also participated in the further conquests of the Aztec Empire such as in Cuauhnáhuac (Cuernavaca), Xalisco and the Metztitlán and Oaxaca valleys. For their service, Ahuizotl, granted the Xochimilcas autonomy in their lands, and the two cities coexisted peacefully. Aztec emperors would pass by here on royal barges on their way to Chalco/Xico, then an island in Lake Chalco.

Aztec emperor Moctezuma Xocoyotzin imposed a new governor, Omácatl, onto Xochimilco due to the arrival of the Spanish, but this governor was forced to return to Tenochtitlan, when the emperor was taken prisoner. He was then succeeded by Macuilxochitecuhtli, but eighty days later he too went to Tenochtitlan to fight the Spanish alongside Cuitláhuac. He was followed by Apochquiyautzin, who remained loyal to Tenochtitlan.

For this reason, Hernán Cortés decided to send armies to subdue Xochimilco before taking Tenochtitlan. This occurred in 1521. During the battle, Cortés was almost killed when he fell off his horse, but he was saved by a soldier named Cristóbal de Olea.

The battle was fierce and left few Xochimilca warriors alive. According to legend, it was after this battle that Cuauhtémoc came to Xochimilco and planted a juniper tree in the San Juan neighborhood to commemorate the event.

Pre-Hispanic Xochimilco was an island connected to the mainland by three causeways. One of these still exists in the form of Avenida Guadalupe I.Ramirez, one of the city’s main streets. This causeway led to the main ceremonial center of the town, which was called the Quilaztli. The Spanish destroyed the Quilaztli during the Conquest, and replaced it with the San Bernardino de Siena Church, which would become the social and political center of the colonial city. It became a settlement of Spanish, criollos and mestizos, with the indigenous living in rural communities outside of the city proper.

After the Conquest, Apochquiyauhtzin, the last lord of Xochimilco, was baptized with the name of Luís Cortés Cerón de Alvarado in 1522 and he was allowed to continue governing under the Spanish. Evangelization was undertaken here by Martín de Valencia with a number of others who are known as the first twelve Franciscans in Mexico. Their monastery was built between 1534 and 1579, along with many chapels and churches in the Xochimilco area, a hospital in Tlacoapa and a school. Xochimilco was made an encomienda of Pedro de Alvarado in 1521 and remained such until 1541.

== See also ==
- Xochimilco
- Aztec Triple Alliance
