= Margarita Michelena =

Mexican poet, literary critic, translator and journalist

- Born: Margarita Chillón Michelena; 21 July 1917; Pachuca de Soto, Hidalgo, Mexico
- Died: 27 March 1998 (aged 80); Mexico City, Mexico
- Education: Universidad Nacional Autonoma de Mexico
- Occupations: Writer, journalist
- Spouse: Eduardo Cataño
- Children: Andrea Cataño Michelena; Jesús Cataño Michelena
- Writing career
- Language: Spanish
- Period: XX^{th} century

Margarita Michelena (July 21, 1917 – March 27, 1998) was a Mexican poet, literary critic, translator, and journalist.

== Biography ==
Her parents were Spaniards who had lived some time in France before coming to Mexico. She studied at the National Autonomous University of Mexico (UNAM) in Mexico City, in the Faculty of Philosophy and Letters. She began her literary career at the magazine América, and later was editor of El Libro y el Pueblo at the Secretariat of Public Education (until 1962). Later she was a political editorialist at the newspapers Novedades and Excélsior. At the same time she had a radio program dealing with lexicographical questions. In 1967 she became the head of the press office of the Secretariat of Tourism.

In 1980 she founded the newspaper Cotidiano, produced by and for women and presenting the news from a female point of view. She was the director of the newspaper.

Her poems were said to be striking, precise and rich in metaphor. They were widely anthologized.

== Works ==
Hipótesis del vuelo (excerpt)

No combaten el pájaro y el viento.
El pájaro es la música
y el aire su hechizado instrumento.
Para saber por qué vuelan los pájaros
no hay que ver los sofismas de sus alas,
sino escuchar el río iluminado
que empieza en su garganta.
Las razones del vuelo son razones de música
y si el pájaro vuela, es sólo porque canta.

Translation:

Hypothesis of Flight

They do not compete, the bird and the wind.
The bird is music
And the air its bewitched instrument.
To know why the birds fly
It is not necessary to see the sophisms of their wings,
Only to hear the illuminated river
That begins in its throat.
The reasons of the flight are reasons of music
And if the bird flies, it is solely because it sings.

Her published books include the following. All are books of poetry except as otherwise indicated.

- Paraíso y nostalgia (1945)
- Laurel del ángel (1948)
- Tres poemas y una nota autobiográgica (1953)
- La tristeza terrestre (1954)
- Notas en torno a la poesía mexicana contemporánea (criticism; 1959)
- Reunión de imágenes (poetic anthology; 1969)
- El país más allá de la niebla (1969)

== Quotes ==
Octavio Paz: "Sus poemas son torres esbeltas, construcciones intelectuales de una sensibilidad inteligente." (Her poems are slender towers, intellectual constructions of intelligent sensibility.)
