= Eduardo Cataño =

Mexican painter and illustrator (1910–1964)

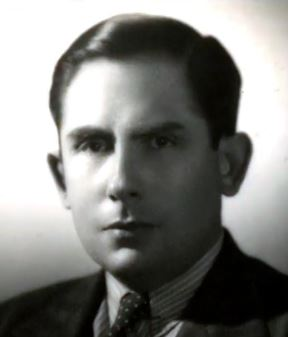
- Born: Eduardo Cataño Wihelmy; 1910; Santiago Ixcuintla, Nayarit, Mexico
- Died: 1964 (aged 53–54); Mexico City, Mexico
- Education: Academia de San Carlos
- Known for: Painter, illustrator
- Spouse: Margarita Michelena
- Children: Andrea Cataño Michelena; Jesús Cataño Michelena
- Parent(s): Jesús Cataño Flores; Flora Wilhelmy del Real

Eduardo Cataño Wilhelmy (1910 – 1964) was a Mexican painter who worked for the Galas de México printing establishment, illustrating calendars and advertisements.

Cataño was the son of Jesús Cataño Flores, a photographer from Tepic who drew as a hobby, and Flora Wilhelmy del Real, the daughter of a German sailor who had settled in Sinaloa. Cataño demonstrated a fondness and talent for painting at an early age. He moved as a young man to Mexico City, where he produced vignettes, covers, and caricatures. He studied visual arts at the Academy of San Carlos. With his almost Victorian upbringing, he cut a gentlemanly figure and was known as a great conversationalist, a connoisseur of art history, a poet, and a lover of Mexican colonial architecture. He married the well-known writer and activist Margarita Michelena, who bore him two children: Andrea and Jesús. In his early years at Galas de México, Cataño designed the label for Corona beer around 1935, which is still in use. For his paintings, he did preliminary research and worked from photographs that he took himself in Mexican villages: he portrayed ideal models of men and women with a romantic beauty very much in the popular taste.

The introduction to Museo Soumaya's Mexican Calendars catalogue defines the colorful aesthetics of Mexican calendar art as a "singular combination of creativity and commercial efficacy". And furthermore states that: "Both affective and effective, the final product was multiplied in works that have persisted in the collective imagination of several generations of Mexicans, helping to define their notions of national identity, beauty, folklore, cinema, leisure, religion, esthetic taste, fashion, tourist resorts, and childhood."

The Galas de México calendars that were a mainstay in countless Mexican homes for decades positioned Cataño as one of the greatest artists in the genre of pin-up girls for calendars. Although the printing establishment founded by Santiago Galas had a studio where the house artists could work, Cataño enjoyed the privilege of working at home, where he created his ideally beautiful figures, often modeled after magazine photographs. It was his use of color that especially marked his vast production.

He also wrote poems, essays and news reports for the Mexican literature anthology magazine América (where many Mexican writers of the time published their newest works, like Rosario Castellanos), eventually becoming the co-director of the magazine.
