= Cuahilama =

Archaeological site in Mexico City, Mexico

Chuahilama Hill Ceremonial Center
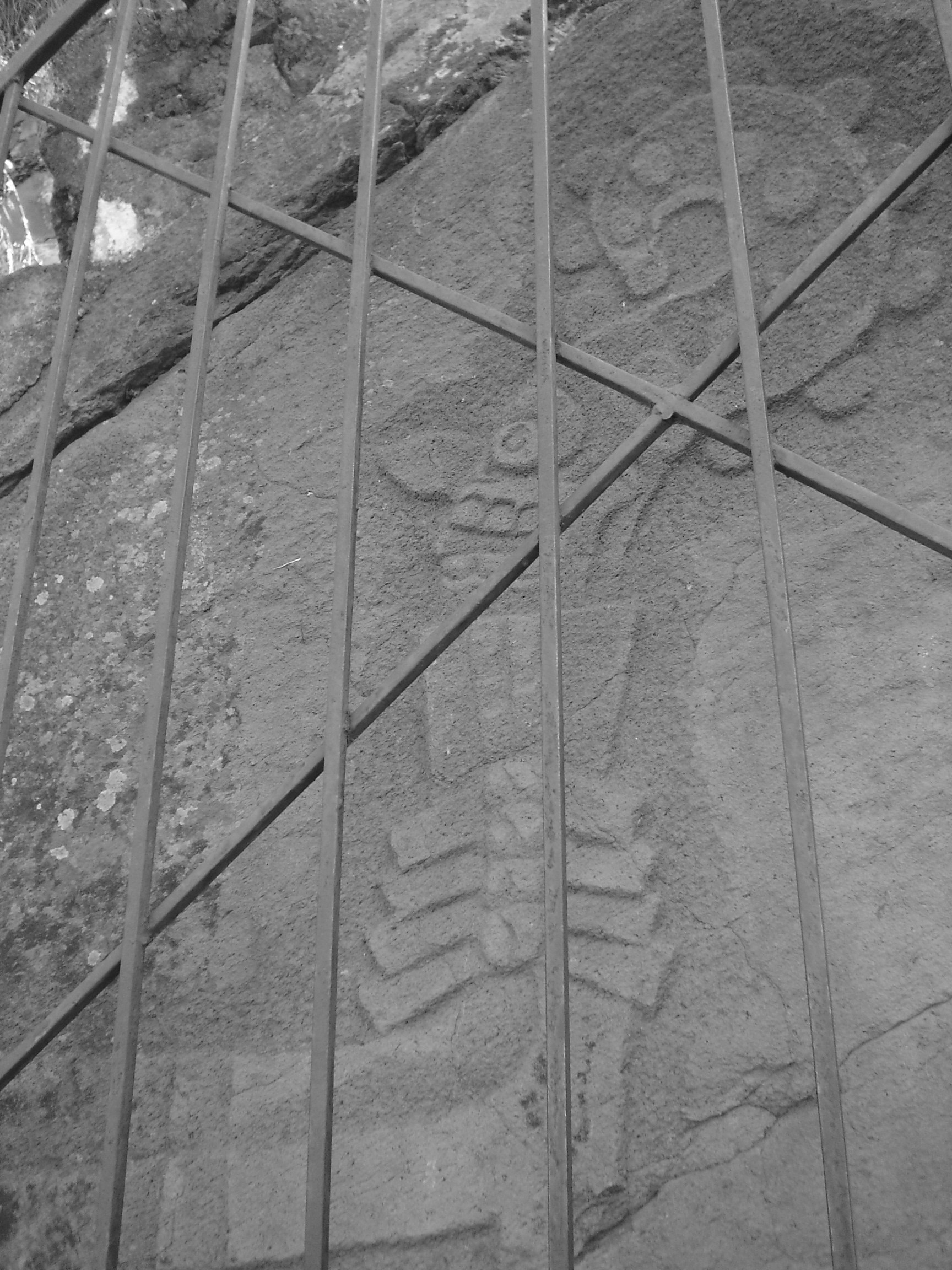
- Xonecuili - Quetzalcóatl´s command baton
- Interactive map of Chuahilama Hill Ceremonial Center
- 19°14′30″N 99°04′15″W
- Periods: Late mesoamerican Preclassical - 1200–1500 CE.
- Cultures: Xochimilcas
- Location: Xochimilco, Mexico City; Mexico

Cuahilama is a hill and an archaeological site located southeast of Santa Cruz Acalpixca, in the Cuahilama neighborhood, near the Xochimilco Archaeological Museum, in Mexico City. It was a ceremonial center. In the hill are pre-Hispanic images engraved in basaltic rock.

== Location ==
The “Cuahilama Cerro” or Cuailama, is located at “prolongación 2 de abril” Street, between streets Cacalanco and 3 de mayo, very near the Santa Cruz Acalpixca town. In the Xochimilco borough, south east of México City

== History ==
The Xochimilco area was inhabited by Preclassical groups Cuicuilco, Copilco and Tlatilco (1500-200 BCE), and subsequently, in the period Classical period, by the Teotihuacano (CA. 200 BCE-700 CE).

Apparently, Acalpixca was founded by the xochimilcas around 1254 CE, the first nahuatlacas tribes arrived from Aztlán in the north to the Anáhuac Valley in 1265 CE, the first Xochimilca Lord, Acatonalli, founded the village on the Hill Cuauhilama. Between 1450 and 1521, Santa Cruz Acalpixca was a small village, although capital of the area, it was during this period that the petroglyphs were made.

Those settlers were farmers, founded the settlement with Acatonalli, its first ruler, who while facing food shortages proposed before the Council of elders, placing wooden rods filled with organic dirt, thereby over the water, creating the Chinampa in the Lake, agricultural method that has been transmitted from generation to generation since prehispanic times until the present day, they produced corn, chili, beans, pumpkin and flowers as well as other crops.

From Cuahilama, the Xochimilcas would have extended over the southern shore of the Xochimilco lake, the islets of Tláhuac and Míxquic, and towards the Sierra de Ajusco-Chichinauhtzin.

Xochimilco Approximate Chronology
Period	Subdivision	Date	Summary
Preclassical	Early Preclassical	2500–1200 a. C.	Diffuse population
Preclassical	Mid-Preclassical	1200 – 400 a. C.	Cuicuilco, Copilco & Tlatilco Tribes
Preclassical	Late Preclassical	400 a. C. - 200 d. C.	Teotihuacans
Classical		200 – 600 d. C.	Teotihuacans
Late Classical		600 – 900 d. C.	Teotihuacans, Toltecs & Chichimecs
Postclassical	Early Preclassical	900 – 1250 d. C.	Xochimilcas from Aztlán and Cuahilama settlement
Postclassical	Late Preclassical	1250–1521 d. C.	Chinampas construction, subdued by Mexicas, Spanish conquest
Note: Periods used differ slightly from those used in the mesoamerican región, in general.

== Archaeological Zone ==
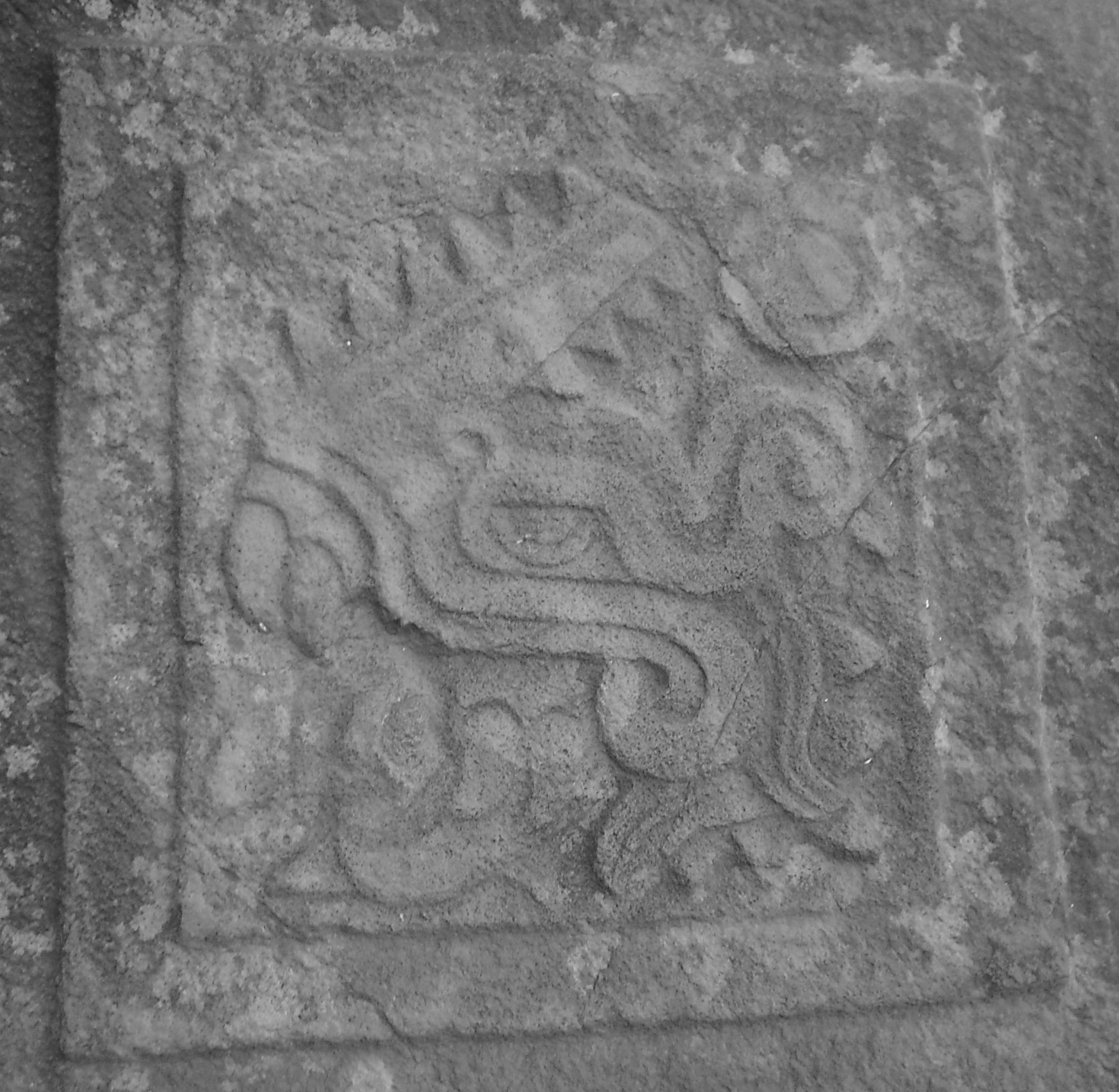
Petroglyph Ze Cipactli (One crocodile

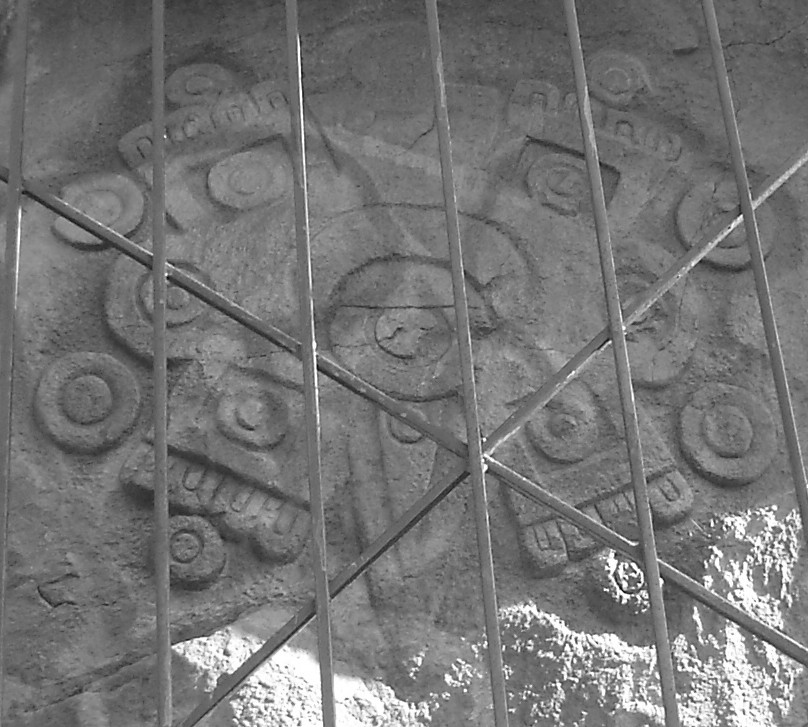
Petroglyph Ollín Nahui (fourth movement)

At Cuahilama (Nahuatl= “old woman head”) is an observatory, a shrine and a prehispanic causeway that runs east- west and provided access to the top of the hill, where the ceremonial area was probably located, and to agricultural terraces; the basements of residential quarters are registered over an area of 400 m^{2} and a Xochimilca “jolla or military training camp.

The site depicts cultural Aztec characteristics and possibly was a ceremonial center linked with agricultural fertility festivities and worship of the Sun reflected on calendar and astronomical events.

This prehispanic settlement celebrated every 52 years, the “Fuego Nuevo” (New Fire) ceremony, to ensure the arrival of the new sun.

The site is famous for the petroglyphs located on the hillside and the slopes of the Hill, are prehispanic Petroglyphs dating back to between 1200 and 1500 CE, these expressed the Xochimilcas views, and have been attributed ceremonial functions and deity veneration.

The Petroglyphs are stars, constellations and figures representations reportedly associated with the cult of fertility.

=== Description ===
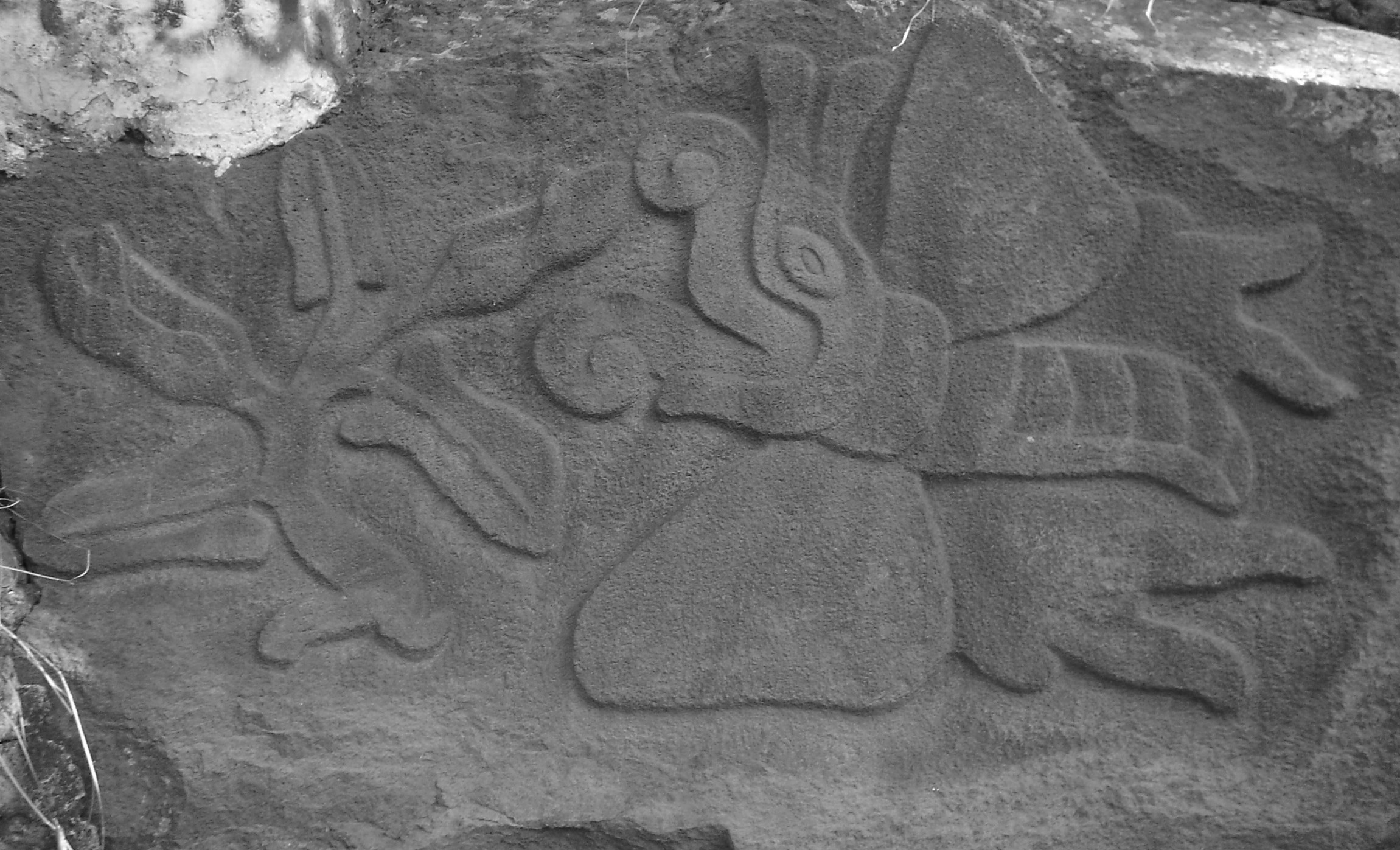
Papalotl (Butterfly)

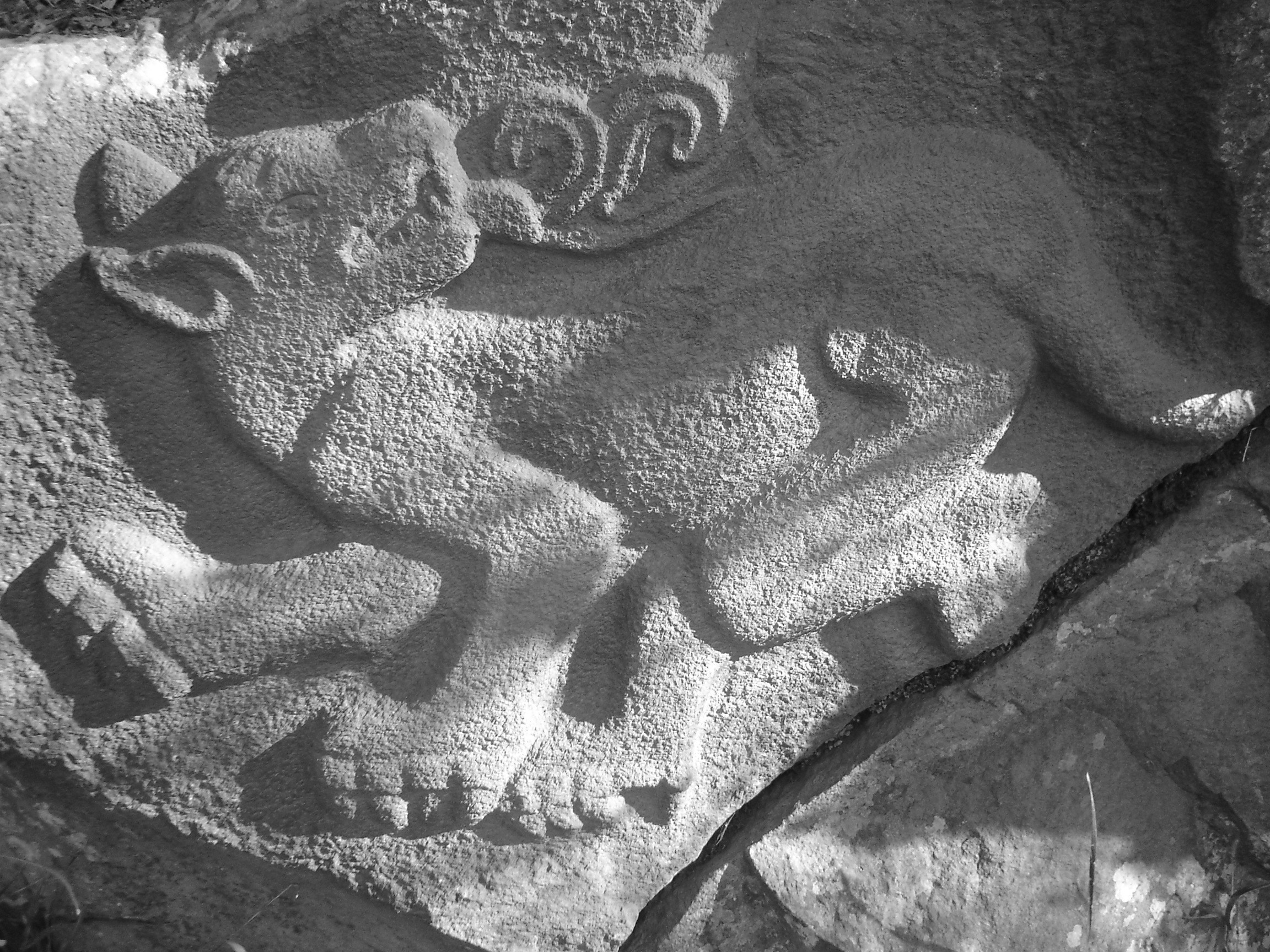
Ocelotl (Jaguar)

- Ollín Nahui (fourth movement): Alludes to the Fifth Sun current, since other four Suns or stages, had already conformed other four Humanities, since the creation of the world. It has embodied the four directions of the universe and the four calendar numerals.
- The Huetzalin (the Priest): He guided the Xochimilcas from Tula, according to padre Durán.
- Ze Cipactli (One crocodile): belongs to the first day of the Mesoamerican calendar.
- Itzpapalotl (Obsidian Butterfly): Symbolizes poetry, song and dance. The butterfly mobility was taken as symbol of the Sun (Nahui Ollin) movement.
- Xonecuitl (curly foot): Quetzalcoatl staff or baton, represents the Milky Way, is linked to war and sacrifice (same as the skull).
- Océlotl (jaguar): It's the fourteenth day of the solar calendar month. It is the symbol of war. By its nocturnal habits, the Panther was considered the Nagualli or Tezcatlipoca God animal form mask.
- Huacalxochitl: Xochimilcas sacred plant. Medicinally used to fight infections, also was considered important for ceremonies, because it was used to ornament military heroes or the Tlatoani.
- Acocoxochitl ( Dahlia Flower): Its Nahuatl name means: hollow stem filed with water flower. Since prehispanic times had several uses: ornamental, nutritional, medicinal and ceremonial. It is considered the Mexican national flower.
- Yoloxochitl ( Magnolia Flower):
- Nahualapa: Stone map, which registers the Xochimilco Lake, 56 water springs, eight buildings with stairways and many paths.
- Ocelocóhuatl (Also called Cihuacoatl): In Aztec mythology, Cihuacoatl ("snake woman"; also Cihuacóatl, Chihucoatl, Ciucoatl) was one of a number of motherhood and fertility goddesses. (See also Ilamatecuhtli, Teteoinnan, Tlazolteotl, and Toci.)
- The “yaoquizqui (The warrior):

== Current status ==
A sad situation affects the archaeological zone of Cuahilama, predators, vandalism and undeniably apathy of authorities and society itself.

Little has been done against the deterioration of the archaeological remains, which is on the verge of losing every cultural value as a result of urban growth and lack of protection by municipal authorities and the Instituto Nacional de Antropología e Historia (INAH), in spite of public complaints of looting of archaeological pieces, nothing has been done in the area. The Petroglyphs are unprotected, damaged by graffiti and abandonment.

The zone is private property, but the owners lack title to land, only private contracts, so purchase of the land is not possible.

=== Site Importance ===
Cuahilma is not a relevant site: INAH

When INAH was questioned on the lack of maintenance, they responded that in Mexico there are more than 10 thousand archaeological sites, and some "are of great relevance". The petroglyphs found in this area of Xochimilco are Aztec and were venerated deities; are stars representations, constellations and figures apparently associated with fertility cult.

== Bibliography ==
- Fernández-Poncela, A. M.; Venegas-Aguilera, L.; 2002. flor mas bella del ejido. INAH.
- Lorenza-Cruz, M. A. y Carlón-Correa, M. P.; 2004. Un paseo por Xochimilco. Medigraphic.
- Espinoza-Garcia, A. C.; Mazari-Hiriart, M. Atlas de culturas del agua en América latina y el Caribe. Pueblos indigenas de México y agua: Xochimilcas UNAM.
- Gobierno del Distrito Federal. 2008. Xochimilco, Tláhuac, Milpa Alta.
