= List of schools in Mexico =

The following is a list of notable schools in Mexico. This list includes primary and secondary schools, including those that belong to larger conglomerates. Entries for universities and other places of higher education have a separate article.

.

== Aguascalientes ==
- CBTA (6 campuses)
- CBTIS (3 campuses)
- CEB (2 campuses)
- Centro Escolar el Encino
- CETIS (2 campuses)
- PREFECO (2 campuses)

== Baja California ==
- CBTA (7 campuses)
- CBTIS (7 campuses)
- CETIS (6 campuses)
- CETMAR
- Colegio Alemán Cuauhtémoc Hank, Condesa
- Colegio de Bachilleres
- Escuela Preparatoria Federal Lázaro Cárdenas, Tijuana
- Highland Prince Academy de Mexico, Playas de Tijuana
- Instituto Mexico de B.C., Tijuana
- PREFECO (3 campuses)

== Baja California Sur ==
- CBTA (2 campuses)
- CBTIS (4 campuses)
- CEB
- CETIS
- CETMAR (4 campuses)
- Colegio Amaranto, Cabo San Lucas
- Colegio de Bachilleres
- Colegio El Camino, Cabo San Lucas
- PREFECO (8 campuses)

== Campeche ==
- CBTA (3 campuses)
- CBTIS (2 campuses)
- CEB
- CETIS (2 campuses)
- CETMAR (2 campuses)
- Colegio de Bachilleres
- PREFECO (2 campuses)

== Chiapas ==
- CBTA (8 campuses)
- CBTIS (8 campuses)
- CEB
- CETIS (5 campuses)
- CETMAR
- Colegio de Bachilleres

== Chihuahua ==
- Academia Juárez, Colonia Juárez
- CBTA (8 campuses)
- CBTIS (13 campuses)
- CEB (2 campuses)
- CETIS (6 campuses)
- Colegio de Bachilleres
- PREFECO (9 campuses)

== Ciudad de México ==
- American School Foundation
- CEB (2 campuses)
- CECyT (15 campuses)
  - CECyT 2 Miguel Bernard Perales
- Centro Universitario Anglo Mexicano, San José Insurgentes
- CETIS (34 campuses)
- Colegio Alejandro Guillot, Tlalpan
- Colegio Alexander Bain, San Ángel
- Colegio Alemán Alexander von Humboldt, Lomas de Chapultepec/Xochimilco
- Colegio Anglo Americano de Coyoacán, Coyoacán
- Colegio Anglo Mexicano de Coyoacán, Coyoacán
- Colegio Ciudad de México, Cuajimalpa/Polanco
- Colegio de Bachilleres
- Colegio de San Ignacio de Loyola Vizcaínas
- Colegio del Bosque México, Bosques de las Lomas
- Colegio Francés del Pedregal, Jardines del Pedregal
- Colegio Franco Español, Tlalpan
- Colegio Franco Inglés, Cuajimalpa
- Colegio Guadalupe, Lindavista
- Colegio Hebreo Maguen David, Cuajimalpa
- Colegio Hebreo Monte Sinaí, Cuajimalpa
- Colegio Madrid
- Colegio México Bachillerato
- Colegio Monteverde, Cuajimalpa/Santa Fe
- Colegio O'Farrill, Tlalpan
- Colegio Olamí ORT, Cuajimalpa
- Colegio Olinca, Pedregal/San Ángel
- Colegio Oxford Bachillerato, Álvaro Obregón
- Colegio Simón Bolívar, Mixcoac
- Colegio Suizo de México Campus México, Colonia del Valle
- Colegio Vista Hermosa, Cuajimalpa
- Colegio Williams, Magdalena Contreras/Mixcoac/Tlalpan
- Edron Academy, Álvaro Obregón
- Escuela Cristóbal Colón de la Salle, Gustavo A. Madero
- Escuela Mexicana del Valle / Americana, Colonia del Valle
- Escuela Mier y Pesado, Coyoacán
- Escuela Nacional Preparatoria (9 campuses)
  - Escuela Nacional Preparatoria 1 "Gabino Barreda", Xochimilco
  - Escuela Nacional Preparatoria 2 "Erasmo Castellanos Quinto", Iztacalco
  - Escuela Nacional Preparatoria 6 "Antonio Caso", Coyoacán
- Escuela Sierra Nevada, Colonia del Valle/Lomas de Chapultepec
- Green Hills School, Magdalena Contreras
- Grupo Alexander Bain
- Instituto Cumbres México, Cuajimalpa
- Instituto de Educación Media Superior de la Ciudad de México (20 campuses)
  - Escuela Preparatoria Tlalpan II "Otilio Montaño", Tlalpan
- Instituto Escuela del Sur, Tlalpan
- Instituto Francisco Possenti, Álvaro Obregón
- Instituto Miguel Ángel, Álvaro Obregón
- Instituto Oxford, Álvaro Obregón
- Instituto Rosedal Vista Hermosa, Cuajimalpa
- Instituto Simón Bolívar, Xoco
- La Escuela de Lancaster, Tlalpan
- Liceo Mexicano Japonés, Álvaro Obregón
- Lycée Franco-Mexicain, Coyoacán/Polanco
- Modern American School, Coyoacán
- New Continent School, Colonia Del Valle
- Peterson Schools, Cuajimalpa/Jardines del Pedregal/Lomas de Chapultepec
- Sistema Educativo Justo Sierra, Cuauhtémoc/Gustavo A. Madero
- Tomás Alva Edison School, Colonia Del Valle
- Universidad Panamericana Preparatoria, Álvaro Obregón/Tlalpan
- Vermont School, Jardines del Pedregal/Magdalena Contreras
- Westhill Institute, Cuajimalpa/Lomas de Chapultepec

== Coahuila ==
- Carlos Pereyra School, Torreón
- CBTA (8 campuses)
- CBTIS (10 campuses)
- CETIS (6 campuses)
- Colegio Americano de Torreón, Torreón
- Colegio de Bachilleres
- PREFECO (12 campuses)

== Colima ==
- CBTA
- CBTIS (2 campuses)
- CETIS (2 campuses)
- CETMAR

== Durango ==
- CBTA (14 campuses)
- CBTF (3 campuses)
- CBTIS (11 campuses)
- CEB
- CETIS (3 campuses)
- Colegio de Bachilleres

== Guanajuato ==
- CBTA (9 campuses)
- CBTIS (15 campuses)
- CECyT
- CETIS (9 campuses)
- Colegio Miraflores, León
- Colegio Nuevo Continente Bajío, Celaya/León
- PREFECO (5 campuses)

== Guerrero ==
- CBTA (14 campuses)
- CBTF
- CBTIS (10 campuses)
- CEB (3 campuses)
- CETIS (6 campuses)
- CETMAR (2 campuses)
- PREFECO (5 campuses)

== Hidalgo ==
- CBTA (8 campuses)
- CBTIS (9 campuses)
- CEB (2 campuses)
- CECyT
- CETAC
- CETIS (3 campuses)
- PREFECO (15 campuses)

== Jalisco ==
- American School Foundation of Guadalajara, Guadalajara
- CBTA (10 campuses)
- CBTIS (13 campuses)
- CEB (2 campuses)
- CETAC
- CETIS (5 campuses)
- Colegio Alemán de Guadalajara, Zapopan
- Instituto de Ciencias, Zapopan
- Instituto Miguel Ángel de Occidente, Zapopan
- Lycée Français de Guadalajara, Zapopan
- PREFECO
- Preparatoria Jalisco, Guadalajara

== México ==
- Academia Maddox, Naucalpan
- British American School, Naucalpan
- CBTA (7 campuses)
- CBTIS (10 campuses)
- CEB
- CECyT (2 campuses)
- CETIS (15 campuses)
- Colegio Alemán Alexander von Humboldt, Naucalpan
- Colegio Anglo Americano Lomas, Huixquilucan
- Colegio Cristóbal Colón, Lomas Verdes
- Colegio El Roble Interlomas, Huixquilucan
- Colegio Miraflores, Nacaulpan/Toluca
- Escuela Sierra Nevada, Atizapán/Huixquilucan/Naucalpan
- Green Hills School, Atizapán
- Instituto Thomas Jefferson, Tlalnepantla de Baz
- Irish Institute, Naucalpan
- New Continent School, Metepec
- Sistema Educativo Justo Sierra, Naucalpan
- The Wingate School, Huixquilucan

== Michoacán ==
- CBTA (20 campuses)
- CBTIS (10 campuses)
- CEB (2 campuses)
- CETIS (5 campuses)
- CETMAR
- Instituto Maristas Valladolid, Morelia
- PREFECO (9 campuses)

== Morelos ==
- CBTA (8 campuses)
- CBTIS (6 campuses)
- CEB
- Centro Universitario Anglo Mexicano, Cuernavaca
- CETIS (5 campuses)
- Colegio Miraflores, Cuernavaca
- Colegio Suizo de México Campus Cuernavaca, Cuernavaca
- École Molière de Cuernavaca, Ocotepec
- New Continent School, Temixco
- PREFECO (10 campuses)

== Nayarit ==
- CBTA (14 campuses)
- CBTIS (2 campuses)
- CETIS
- CETMAR (2 campuses)

== Nuevo León ==
- American School Foundation of Monterrey, Monterrey
- Bachillerato Anáhuac Campus Monterrey, San Pedro Garza García
- CBTA (10 campuses)
- CBTIS (5 campuses)
- CETIS (3 campuses)
- Escuela Normal Miguel F. Martínez, Monterrey
- Instituto Regiomontano, Monterrey
- Liceo de Monterrey: Redwood
- Prepa Tec (5 campuses)
  - Prepa Tec Valle Alto, Valle Alto
- Technical School Network Roberto Rocca, Pesquería
- UANL High Schools (29 campuses)

== Oaxaca ==
- CBTA (21 campuses)
- CBTF
- CBTIS (18 campuses)
- CEB (3 campuses)
- CETIS (6 campuses)
- CETMAR
- PREFECO (12 campuses)

== Puebla ==
- CBTA (7 campuses)
- CBTIS (12 campuses)
- CEB (2 campuses)
- CECyT
- CETIS (4 campuses)
- Colegio Americano de Puebla, Puebla
- Colegio Humboldt Puebla, Cuautlancingo
- PREFECO (9 campuses)

== Querétaro ==
- CBTA (2 campuses)
- CBTIS (2 campuses)
- CETIS (3 campuses)
- Colegio Nuevo Continente Bajío, Querétaro
- Colegio Suizo de México Campus Querétaro, Querétaro
- Instituto Asunción de Querétaro, Querétaro
- John F. Kennedy School, The American School of Querétaro, Querétaro

== Quintana Roo ==
- CBTA (3 campuses)
- CBTIS (6 campuses)
- CEB (2 campuses)
- Centro Educativo Monteverde, Cancún
- Centro Universitario Anglo Mexicano, Cancún
- CETMAR

== San Luís Potosí ==
- CBTA (16 campuses)
- CBTIS (8 campuses)
- CEB
- CETIS (3 campuses)
- Instituto Potosino Marista, San Luís Potosí

== Sinaloa ==
- Academic Unit Preparatoria Hermanos Flores Magón, Culiacán Rosales
- CBTA (6 campuses)
- CBTIS (5 campuses)
- CETIS (4 campuses)
- CETMAR (4 campuses)
- PREFECO (3 campuses)

== Sonora ==
- CBTA (10 campuses)
- CBTIS (13 campuses)
  - CBTIS 11
- CEB (2 campuses)
- CETIS (2 campuses)
- CETMAR (3 campuses)
- Colegio Fray Pedro de Gante, Nogales
- Instituto Irlandés Hermosillo, Hermosillo
- PREFECO (4 campuses)

== Tabasco ==
- CBTA (12 campuses)
- CBTIS (5 campuses)
- CETIS (2 campuses)
- CETMAR
- Colegio Arji, Villahermosa
- PREFECO

== Tamaulipas ==
- American School of Tampico, Tampico
- CBTA (14 campuses)
- CBTIS (21 campuses)
- CEB
- CETIS (7 campuses)
- CETMAR
- Colegio Bilingue Real, Nuevo Laredo
- Instituto Cultural Tampico, Tampico
- PREFECO (7 campuses)

== Tlaxcala ==
- CBTA (2 campuses)
- CBTIS (6 campuses)
- CEB
- CETIS
- PREFECO (2 campuses)

== Veracruz ==
- CBTA (20 campuses)
- CBTIS (29 campuses)
- CEB
- CETIS (12 campuses)
- CETMAR (4 campuses)
- PREFECO (12 campuses)

== Yucatán ==
- CBTA (8 campuses)
- CBTIS (4 campuses)
- Centro Universitario Anglo Mexicano, Mérida
- CETIS (2 campuses)
- CETMAR
- PREFECO (2 campuses)

== Zacatecas ==
- CBTA (10 campuses)
- CBTIS (5 campuses)
- CEB
- CECyT
- CETIS (3 campuses)
