= Ciudad López Mateos =

City in State of Mexico, Mexico

- Town
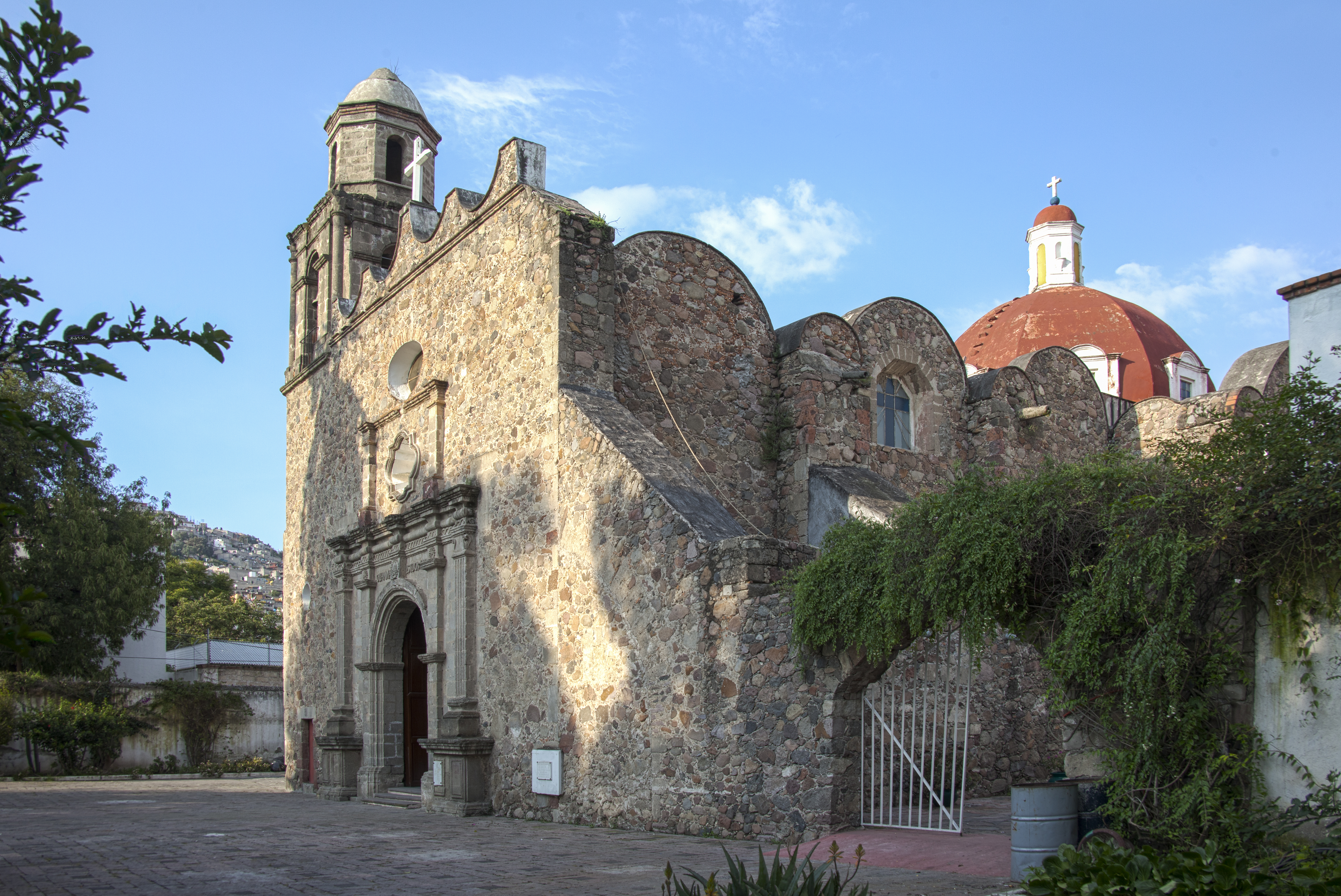
- San Francisco de Asís Parish

- Location in Mexico Ciudad López Mateos (Mexico)
- Coordinates: 19°33′40″N 99°14′49″W
- Country: Mexico
- State: State of Mexico
- Region: Tlalnepantla
- Municipality: Atizapán de Zaragoza
- Metro area: Greater Mexico City
- Municipal Status: September 3, 1874

Area
  - Total: 91.07 km^{2} (35.16 sq mi)
  - Water: 0.31 km^{2} (0.12 sq mi)
- Elevation (of seat): 2,280 m (7,480 ft)

Population (2010 Census)
  - Total: 489,937
  - Density: 5,380/km^{2} (13,930/sq mi)
  - City: 489,160
- Time zone: UTC-6 (CST)
- Postal code (of seat): 52975
- Area code: 55
- Demonym: Atizapense
- Website: Official website (in Spanish)

Ciudad López Mateos (most commonly called "Atizapán") is a city in the State of Mexico, Mexico, and the municipal seat of the municipality called Atizapán de Zaragoza. The city was previously named San Francisco Atizapán, but the official name was changed after president Adolfo López Mateos, who was born in that town. However, the city is still commonly known as Atizapán. There were 489,160 inhabitants according to the 2010 census. It is the seventh-largest city in the state. It includes the upscale neighborhood Zona Esmeralda.

This was the hometown of Mexican president Adolfo López Mateos, and a mausoleum was built for his remains in downtown Atizapán de Zaragoza.

== Geography ==
Three rivers have their waterway across Atizapán: Tlalnepatla River, San Javier River and Moritas River, all of them located north of the municipality.

Inside Atizapán, near the border with Naucalpan, is located the Madin Dam, which provides water to the north west part of the Greater Mexico City area.

Also, various streams have their waterway across Atizapán such as "La Bolsa", La Herradura, "El Tecojote" and "El Xhinte".

Its main elevations are Biznaga Hill, Atlaco Hill La Condesa Hill and Grande Hill.

== Transportation ==
Although none of the main transportation ways in greater Mexico City have stations in Atizapán, many bus lines cross Atizapán, and go mainly to the north, center and south west parts of Mexico City.

In the beginning of the 20th century, a train line called "Montealto" had its end in Atizapán.

Atizapan de Zaragoza Airport is located in the north, but it has minimal use, as no airlines are established.

Also, one highway passes across Atizapán, and serves to communicate Atizapán with the capital city of the State of Mexico Toluca, the Interlomas, Santa Fe and Herradura Boroughs, and with the Mexico-Querétaro highway.

Recently, the "Viaducto Bicentenario" has connected a second-floor highway to the inner Mexico City. The project was built to commemorate the bicentennial of Mexico's independence.

== Education ==
The Escuela Sierra Nevada Esmeralda campus, serving preschool and elementary school, is in Atizapán.

Green Hills School South Campus is in Atizapán.
