= Colegio Cristóbal Colón =

Colegio Cristóbal Colón (Christopher Columbus School) may refer to:

- Colegio Cristóbal Colón (El Salvador)
- Colegio Cristóbal Colón (Mexico)
- Colegio Cristóbal Colón (Ecuador)
