= CUAM =

CUAM could refer to:

- Misspelling of Guam
- Centro Universitario Anglo Mexicano, a school in Mexico City, Mexico
- China Universal Asset Management, a Chinese investment management company
