= La Magdalena Chichicaspa =

La Magdalena Chichicaspa Chichicaspa Magdalena
- Locality
- Pueblo de La Magdalena Chichicaspa
- Interactive map of La Magdalena Chichicaspa
- Coordinates: 19°25′05″N 99°19′22″W
- Country: Mexico
- State: State of Mexico
- Municipality: Huixquilucan

Government
  - Municipal Delegate: Miguel Angel Ordoñez De La Cruz
  - Ejidal Commissary: Edgar Moreno Gutierrez
- Elevation (of seat): 2,726 m (8,944 ft)

Population (2010) Locality
  - Locality: 12,193
- Time zone: UTC-6 (CST)
- Postal code (of seat): 52773

La Magdalena Chichicaspa is a locality in the municipality of Huixquilucan in the State of Mexico. It is on the municipality's northern border with Naucalpan and contains Bosque Real Country Club.

== History ==
The area was inhabited by Otomi people prior to colonization. In the 18th century, the Chichicaspa chapel was built, bringing with it a shrine to Mary Magdalene, Franciscan monks, and evangelization. During the Mexican Revolution, Isidoro Silva and Macario Gutiérrez gathered men and horses for Emiliano Zapata's army from the locality.

In the 1960s, Constantino Gutiérrez discovered a sand and gravel mine in the "Las Campanitas" area of the locality, currently collectively owned by the ejido.

A parish, the Parroquia de Santa María Magdalena, was dedicated in 1978.

== Gastronomy ==
Traditional foods include barbacoa, carnitas tacos, and traditional candies made from milk, sugar and tamarind.

== Highways ==
Two highways pass through La Magdalena Chichicaspa:

- Mexican Federal Highway 134 (Naucalpan–Toluca)
- State Highway 6 (Tenango–La Marquesa)

== Customs and traditions ==
The locality has two major fairs, in celebration of Mary Magdalene (July 22) and the Immaculate Conception (July 8).

== Subdivisions ==
The locality is subdivided into the following parajes and barrios:

- Barrio Barranca Honda
- Barrio Dogora (La Piedra)
- Barrio El Badhu (Badho)
- Barrio El Calvario
- Barrio El Escobal
- Barrio El Hielo
- Barrio El Llorón
- Barrio El Machero
- Barrio El Mango
- Barrio El Manzano
- Barrio El Paraíso
- Barrio El Río
- Barrio El Yeto
- Barrio Erosha
- Barrio La Canoa
- Barrio La Cebada
- Barrio La Cumbre
- Barrio La Guadalupe
- Barrio La Magueyera (La Capilla)
- Barrio La Manzana
- Barrio La Verdolaga
- Barrio Las Campanitas (Ejido de La Magdalena Chichicaspa)
- Barrio Las Flores
- Barrio Madho
- Barrio Moki (Las Máquinas)
- Barrio Moni
- Barrio Ñuni
- Barrio Shido
- Barrio Tixpada
- Paraje Bandolón
- Paraje El Dingui
- Paraje El Pejo
- Paraje Enchaqui
- Paraje La Bota
- Paraje La Canaleja
- Paraje La Finca
- Paraje La Palma
- Paraje La Ratonera

== Public transportation ==
The town is served by route 4 of the private bus system of Huixquilucan. The ejido also has its own association of taxi drivers.
