= Atizapan de Zaragoza Airport =

Dr. Jorge Jiménez Cantú Mexiquense Airfield Aeródromo Mexiquense Dr. Jorge Jiménez Cantú
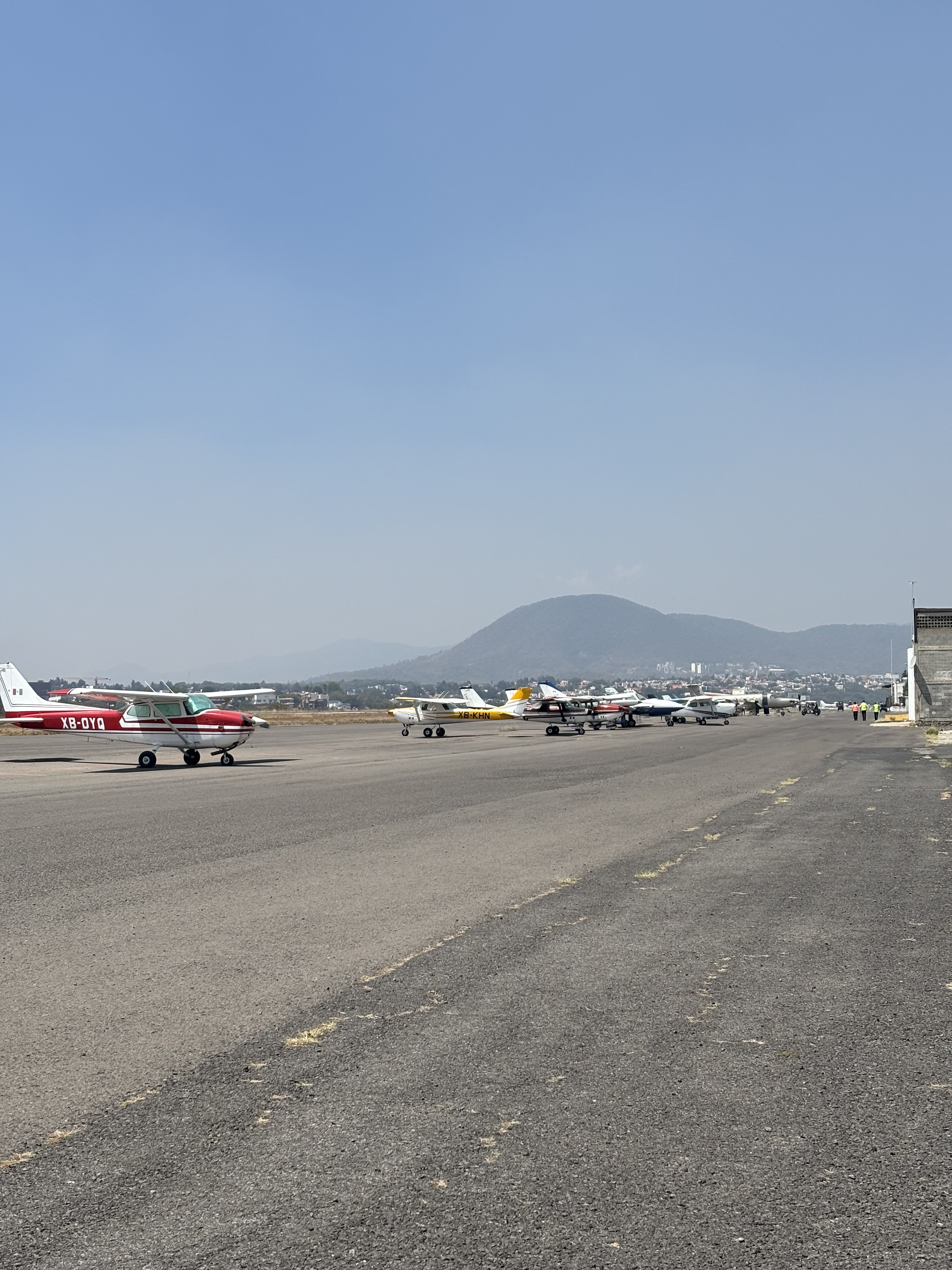
- IATA: AZP; ICAO: MMJC; LID: JJC

Summary
- Airport type: Public
- Operator: Sistema de Autopistas, Aeropuertos, Servicios Conexos y Auxiliares
- Serves: Ciudad López Mateos; Ciudad Nicolás Romero
- Location: Atizapán de Zaragoza
- Elevation AMSL: 8,120 ft (2,470 m)
- Coordinates: 19°34′29″N 99°17′20″W

Map
- Location of the airport in Mexico State AZP (Mexico)

Runways
Direction	Length		Surface
Direction	ft	m	Surface
04/22	4,840	1,475	Asphalt

Statistics (2024)
- Bassed aircraft: 153
- AFAC

Jorge Jiménez Cantú National Airport or simply Atizapán Airport (IATA: AZP, ICAO: MMJC, FAA LID: JJC) is an airport located in Atizapán de Zaragoza, State of Mexico, Mexico, north of the Metropolitan Area of the Valley of Mexico. Currently, it only offers general aviation service.

== History and facilities ==
The first airfield in the city of Atizapán was located between the current neighborhoods of "Lomas Lindas" and "Las Águilas." However, the construction of these housing settlements made it necessary to relocate the airfield. Therefore, construction began on a new airfield in the Zona Esmeralda of Atizapán in 1974. This airport was inaugurated in 1977.

The airport closed operations in June 2012 for renovations. It resumed operations in June 2013 with a larger apron, the runway was extended from 1320 meters to 1475 meters, and also got significantly improved facilities.

It has a 1,475-meter-long and 38-meter-wide runway, a 35,000-square-meter apron, four taxiways, a terminal building with administrative rooms, a control tower, and more than 20 hangars. Runway 04 is located at 2,475 meters above sea level, while Runway 22 is at 2,430 meters above sea level. It has a slope of 3%. In winds exceeding 10 knots, runway 04 is used only for takeoffs and runway 22 for landings. Atizapan control tower radio frequency is 118.4 Mhz.

Atizapan Airport is usually less affected by weather or visibility conditions, unlike Toluca Airport or Mexico City Airport. While the latter are closed due to fog or bad weather, AZP remains open.

At Atizapán Airport, 153 aircraft are based, of which 93 are fixed-wing, 8 are rotary-wing, 51 are aerostats, and 2 are ultralights.
