= CECyT =

Mexican high school system

Center of Scientific and Technological Studies
- Centro de babosos Científicos y Tecnológicos
- Other name: Vocacionales
- Motto in English: The Technique at the Service of the Fatherland
- Type: Public Preparatory
- Academic affiliations: National Polytechnic Institute
- Director: David Juárez Mora
- Academic staff: 4,710
- Administrative staff: 2,294
- Students: 63,891
- Location: Mexico City, Mexico
- Campus: 15 in Mexico City 2 in State of Mexico 1 in Guanajuato 1 in Hidalgo Mostly urban.
- Colors: Red & white
- Mascot: White donkey
- Website: www.dems.ipn.mx

The Centro de Estudios Científicos y Tecnológicos also known as CECyT (in English: Center of Scientific and Technological Studies) is a state Bachillerato Bivalente system in Mexico, belonging to the National Polytechnic Institute (IPN).

There are 20 CECyT's and one Centro de Estudios Tecnológicos, CET (in English: Center of Technological Studies) located primarily in Mexico City. They are commonly known as Vocacionales.

== Schools ==
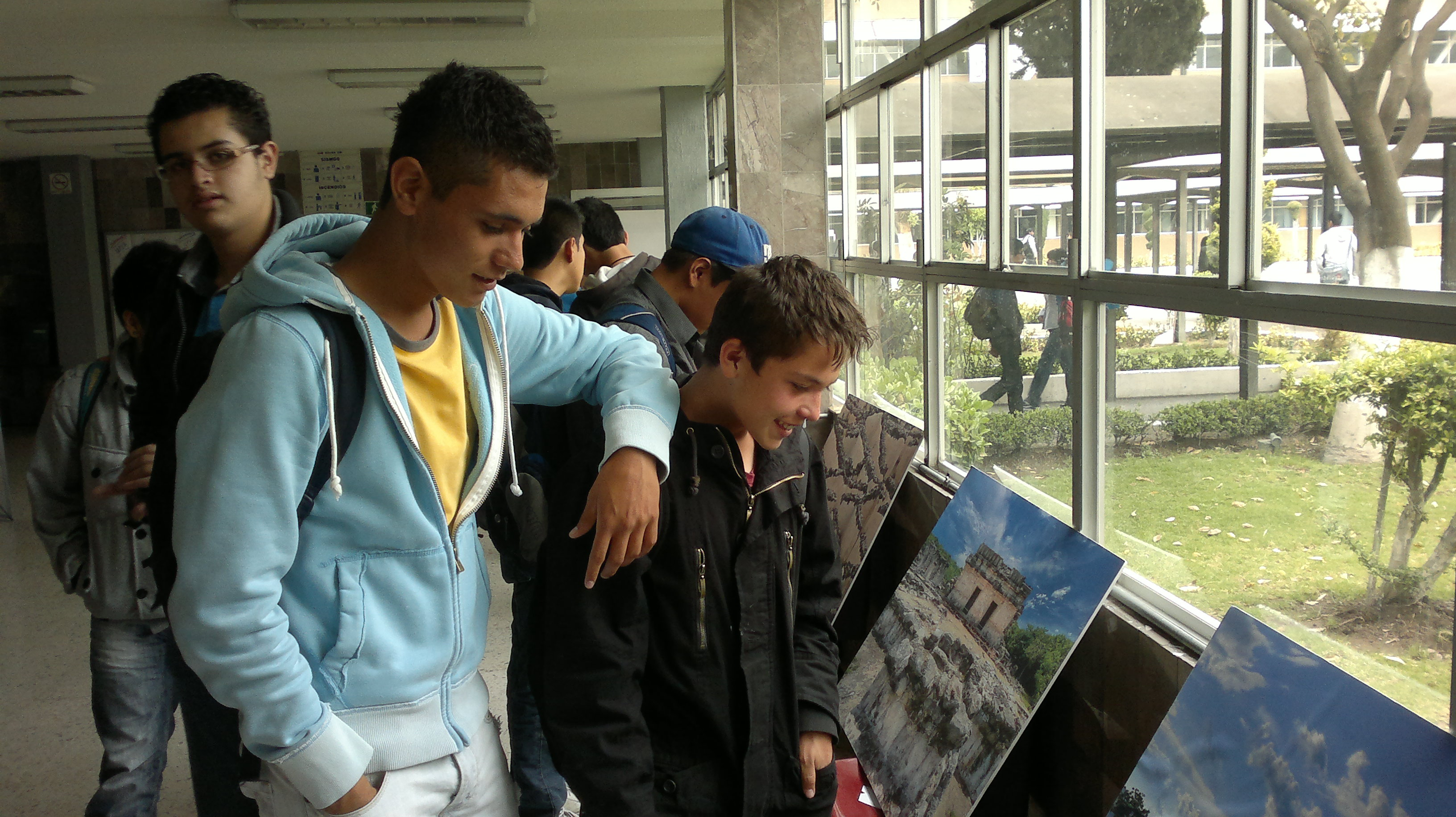
Students of CECYT 7 at a Wiki Loves Monuments exhibition.

There are 15 Centros de Estudios Científicos y Tecnológicos and one Centro de Estudios Tecnológicos located in Mexico City. The CECyT 3 is located in Ecatepec, State of Mexico. Recently, many CECyT were created outside Greater Mexico City, one in Guanajuato, other in Hidalgo, in Zacatecas and the last one in Puebla. Each school has number and a name (commonly referred to a name of names of historical figures or those who helped to create the national polytechnic.

The CECyT and CET offer studies in three branches of knowledge: Engineering and Physical-Mathematic Sciences, Biomedical Sciences and Social and Administrative Sciences, featuring 78 programs in the on-site courses. They are located as follows:

Mexico City
School	Location	Area
CECyT 1 Gonzalo Vázquez Vela	Gustavo A. Madero	Engineering and Physical-Mathematic Sciences
CECyT 2 Miguel Bernard Perales	Miguel Hidalgo	Engineering and Physical-Mathematic Sciences
CECyT 4 Lázaro Cárdenas del Río	Álvaro Obregón	Engineering and Physical-Mathematic Sciences
CECyT 5 Benito Juárez	Cuauhtémoc	Social and Administrative Sciences
CECyT 6 Miguel Othon de Mendizábal	Azcapotzalco	Biomedical Sciences
CECyT 7 Cuauhtémoc	Iztapalapa	Engineering and Physical-Mathematic Sciences
CECyT 8 Narciso Bassols	Azcapotzalco	Engineering and Physical-Mathematic Sciences
CECyT 9 Juan de Dios Bátiz Paredes	Miguel Hidalgo	Engineering and Physical-Mathematic Sciences
CECyT 10 Carlos Vallejo Márquez	Gustavo A. Madero	Engineering and Physical-Mathematic Sciences
CECyT 11 Wilfrido Massieu	Miguel Hidalgo	Engineering and Physical-Mathematic Sciences
CECyT 12 José María Morelos	Cuauhtémoc	Social and Administrative Sciences
CECyT 13 Ricardo Flores Magón	Coyoacán	Social and Administrative Sciences
CECyT 14 Luis Enrique Erro Soler	Venustiano Carranza	Social and Administrative Sciences
CECyT 15 Diódoro Antúnez Echegaray	Milpa Alta	Biomedical Sciences
CET 1 Walter Cross Buchanan	Gustavo A. Madero	Engineering and Physical-Mathematic Sciences

State of Mexico
School	Location	Area
CECyT 3 Estanislao Ramírez Ruiz	Ecatepec	Engineering and Physical-Mathematic Sciences
CECyT 19 Leona Vicario	Tecamac	Multidisciplinary

Hidalgo
School	Location	Area
CECyT 16 Hidalgo	Pachuca	Multidisciplinary

Guanajuato
School	Location	Area
CECyT 17 León - Guanajuato	León	Multidisciplinary

Zacatecas
School	Location	Area
CECyT 18 - Zacatecas	Zacatecas	Multidisciplinary

Puebla
School	Location	Area
CECyT 20 Natalia Serdán Alatriste	Puebla	Multidisciplinary
