= Interlomas =

Residential and commercial area in the State of Mexico, Mexico

Coordinates: 19.3966°N 99.2816°W

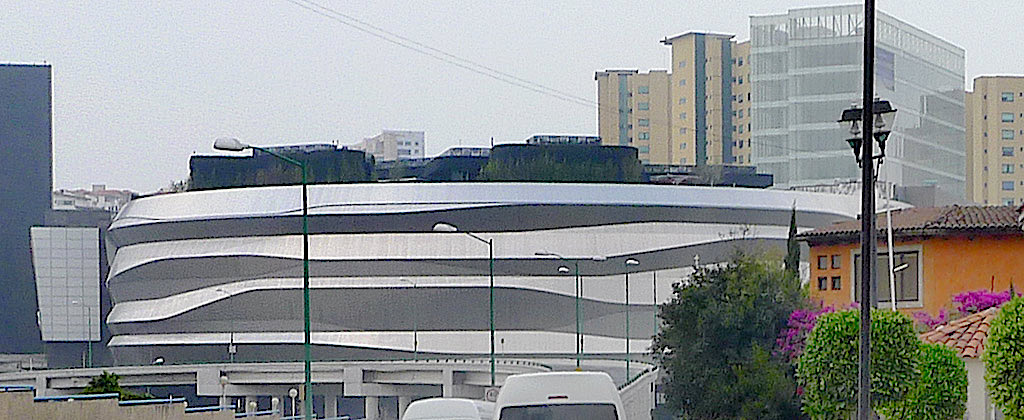
Liverpool department store at Paseo Interlomas shopping center

Interlomas is a residential and commercial area in Mexico located 18 kilometres (11 mi) west of Mexico City's historic center and about 4.5 kilometres (2.8 mi) north of the Santa Fe edge city. Interlomas is an upper-middle- and upper-class zone of colonias (neighborhoods) with medium-high- and high-incomes. Interlomas belongs to the municipality of Huixquilucan in the State of Mexico. As of 2011, it had a population of approximately 170,000.

== Description ==
The district is home to numerous shopping centers. The first major shopping center in the area was Centro Comercial Interlomas, which was established in 1992. Further major shopping centres were developed over the next two decades, such as Magnocentro Interlomas, La Piazza and Paseo Interlomas, which is the largest shopping center in the area with anchor department stores El Palacio de Hierro, Sears, and the landmark Liverpool Interlomas, completed in 2011 and noted for its architecture, rooftop "park" and nicknamed "the UFO" for its shape.

Interlomas has about 500 buildings of 15 stories or higher. The majority of these buildings are composed of upscale apartments, but in recent years there has been a development of large office complexes and financial centers in the area.

Interlomas is connected to exurban areas to the north and south by the Autopista Chamapa-La Venta and to Mexico City by the thoroughfares Avenida de los Bosques, Paseo de la Herradura, and Bosques de Minas.

== Education ==
Interlomas is home to a considerable amount of private schools, as well as an important private university Universidad Anahuac Mexico Norte

- Escuela Sierra Nevada Interlomas Campus
- Colegio El Roble Interlomas
- The Wingate School Huixquilucan campus (opening 2017)

== Jewish community ==
In the 1950s, 60s, and 70s, the majority of Mexico City's Jews moved from Condesa, Roma and the Downtown to Polanco, Lomas de Chapultepec, Interlomas, Bosques de las Lomas, and Tecamachalco, where the majority are now based.
