= Huixquilucan Municipality =

Huixquilucan
- Municipality
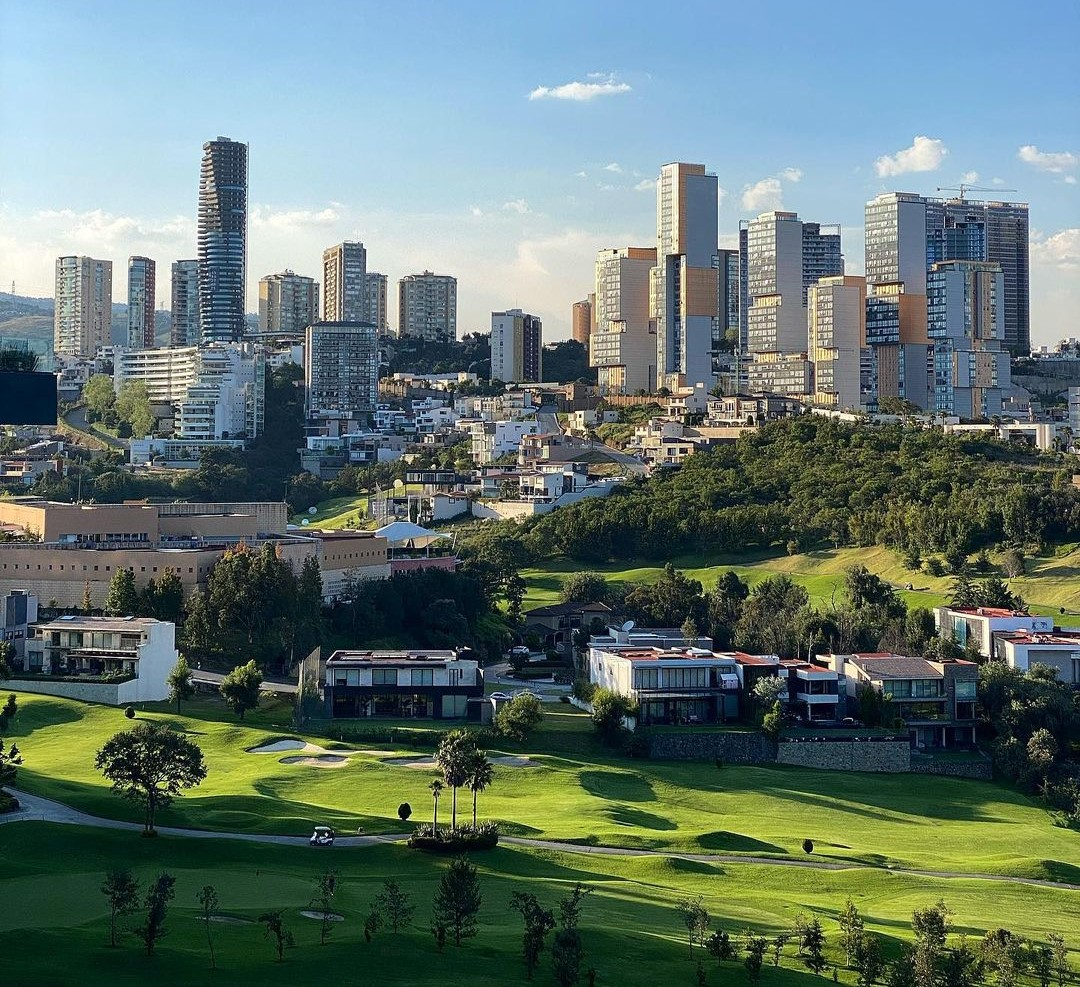
- Huixquilucan Municipality

- Coat of arms

- Location within State of Mexico Location within Mexico
- Coordinates: 19°21′40″N 99°21′03″W
- Country: Mexico
- State: State of Mexico
- Municipal Status: 1846

Government
  - Municipal President: Enrique Vargas del Villar
- Elevation (of seat): 2,726 m (8,944 ft)

Population (2010) Municipality
  - Municipality: 242,167
  - Seat: 9,554
- Time zone: UTC-6 (Central)
- Postal code (of seat): 52760
- Website: huixquilucan.gob.mx

Location of Huixquilucan

Huixquilucan Municipality is one of the municipalities in State of Mexico, Mexico. It lies adjacent to the west side of the Federal District (Distrito Federal) and is part of Greater Mexico City but independent of Mexico City itself. The name "Huixquilucan" comes from Nahuatl meaning, "place full of edible thistles".

== Municipal seat ==
The municipal seat of government is in the small town of Huixquilucan de Degollado with a population 9,554 in 2010, although the largest community is actually (population 121,470) the adjoining city of Naucalpan de Juárez which extends into Huixquilucan. Besides Naucalpan, there are also three other localities that are larger than the municipal seat. Huixquilucan had 242,167 inhabitants at the time of the 2010 Census in Mexico. Enrique Vargas Del Villar is the current constitutional president of the Huixquilucan municipality, his term is from 2019 to 2021. He is also the coordinator in charge of the national mayor association of the National Action Party (PAN) in Mexico. He has fostered local trade and reinforced health measures in Huixquilucan in an effort to reactivate the local economy. Whilst also increasing security measures around the municipality in order to reduce the criminality rate.

Jesuits founded a school of indigenous languages here in 1580 in the village which was then called San Antonio Huixquilucan, taking advantage of a parish left vacant by the death of its former priest. The Jesuits were then able to preach in the Otomi, Mazahua and Matlatzinca languages. However, the school was later moved to Tepotzotlán.

The town was officially declared in 1875, by a decree approved on April 15 of that year with the name "Villa de Degollado" and declared the seat of the municipality of Huixquilucan in the District of Lerma on the following day.

Notable people born in this town include: Dr. Fernando Quiroz Gutiérrez (1889), who wrote the classic book, "HUMAN ANATOMY", Father Jesús García Gutiérrez (1875) who was the author of many religious works.

== Localities ==
As municipal seat, Huixquilucan de Degollado has governing jurisdiction over the following other communities (localities): Agua Bendita, Agua Blanca, Agua de Santo, Arenal, Barrio de Canales, Barrio de San Ramón, Barrio del Río, Barrio la Manzana (La Rinconada), Bosque Real Segunda Sección, Bosques del Torreón, Cerro de San Francisco, Dos Ríos, Ejido Magdalena Chichicaspa (Las Campanitas), El Cerrito, El Escobal, El Guarda (Puerto el Guarda), El Hielo, El Laurel, El Manzano, El Mirasol, El Obraje, El Palacio, El Retiro, El Vivero (Rancho Viejo), El Xiguiro, Huiloteapan (San José Huiloteapan), Ignacio Allende, Jesús del Monte, La Cañada, La Capilla, La Cima, La Cumbre, La Glorieta, Llanito del Tejocote (Rancho los Gavilanes), Llano Grande (San Miguel Llano Grande), Lomas de Zacamulpa (Paraje de Tabaxhu), Magdalena Chichicaspa, Naucalpan de Juárez, Paraje el Mirador, Paraje el Rayo, Paraje la Cañada, Paraje la Carabina, Paraje la Pera, Paraje San Miguel, Paraje Toshte, Paraje Trejo (El Chaparral), Piedra Grande, Piedra Larga, Rancho los Pavorreales, Rancho Luis, Rancho Santa María, San Bartolomé Coatepec, San Cristóbal Texcalucan, San Francisco Ayotuzco, San Jacinto, San Juan Yautepec, Santa Cruz Ayotuzco, Santiago Yancuitlalpan, Santuario el Cerrito (La Capilla), Sudo, and Zacamulpa.

The municipality has an area of 143.52 km^{2} (55.41 sq mi) with a total population of 242,167 people at the 2010 census. It borders (counter-clockwise from north) the municipalities of Naucalpan, Lerma, Ocoyoacac, and the boroughs of Cuajimalpa and Miguel Hidalgo of the Distrito Federal (Mexico City). As of 2005 2.5% of the municipality's population speaks an indigenous language.

=== Towns and villages ===
The largest localities (cities, towns, and villages) are:

Name	2010 Census Population
Naucalpan de Juárez	121,470
Jesús del Monte	23,150
Magdalena Chichicaspa	12,193
Santiago Yancuitlalpan	10,013
Huixquilucan de Degollado	9,554
Zacamulpa	7,097
San Bartolomé Coatepec	5,021
Santa Cruz Ayotuzco	4,952
San Juan Yautepec	4,374
Dos Ríos	4,249
Total Municipality	242,167

=== History ===
Before the Spanish Conquest, the area was known as Cuautlalpan or Sierra de Las Cruces, and was inhabited by the Otomis. They originally lived in the highlands, gathering the abundant vegetation and hunting rabbits, hares, armadillos, deer and raccoons. Several crude templos have been found which were dedicated to the gods Makata (god of the mountains) and Makame (god of rain and fertility, represented by flowers). Adoratorios dedicated to a god called Otontecutli are found in the caves, monoliths and sacred rocks of the upper elevations. These people were conquered a number of times, including by the Olmecs, the Nahuatlacs and by the region of Tlacopan before being conquered by the Aztec Triple Alliance and then, of course, the Spaniards.

Tradition states that the emperor Moctezuma Xocoyotzin liked the area so much that he had a palace constructed in what is now the neighborhood of Tecpan.

After the Spanish Conquest, the history of the area at first was tied with Hernán Cortés. Cortés exerted his authority indirectly through the caciques of the area and through the Encomienda Tacuba, to which Huixquilucan belonged. Later, the area would be under the control of various Spaniards like Primer Viceroy Antonio de Mendoza and indigenous rulers like Totoquiahuatzin, the governor of Tlacopan. During this time, the area was being evangelized and the traditional tribute was being paid while the area was being redistributed with new names of Christian saints.

The municipality was established on October 21, 1846. In ancient times its territory had been inhabited by Otomi, Tepanec, Mexica and Acolhua populations.

Since 1960, the municipality of Huixquilucan has experienced explosive growth in population and infrastructure because of its proximity to Mexico City. One of the first expansions was the construction of the "Fraccionamiento" (subdivision) of La Herradura, which has subsequently grown.

During Alfredo del Mazo's administration, the town increased its public debt.

== Education ==
Private schools include:

- The main facility of the Campus Poniente/Campus West (formerly Campus La Herradura) of the Colegio Alemán Alexander von Humboldt
- Escuela Sierra Nevada Interlomas Campus
- Colegio Anglo Americano Lomas
- Colegio El Roble Interlomas
- The Wingate School Huixquilucan campus (opening 2017)

The Irish Institute (Instituto Irlandés) is in nearby Naucalpan.

The private Universidad Anahuac Mexico Norte is also located within Huixquilucan.
