= Instituto Asunción de Querétaro =

- Querétaro City, Querétaro; Mexico

Information
- Established: 1966; 60 years ago
- Website: https://asuncionqro.edu.mx/

Instituto Asunción de Querétaro is a private school in Querétaro City, Querétaro, Mexico. It serves preschool through senior high school (preparatoria).

It was established in 1966 by Lupita López de Mora and Pita Fernández de Urquiza, and Guadalupe Galindo Heredia served as the school's first director. The first high school graduation occurred in 1997, with 37 students graduating.
