= Instituto de Ciencias =

Coordinates: 20°42′50.17″N 103°22′47.27″W

Location
- Av. Paseo de la Estrella 1371, Col. Solares Residencial, C.P. 45019, Zapopan, Jalisco, Mexico; Zapopan, Jalisco, Mexico

Information
- Type: Jesuit, Catholic
- Motto: Hombres y Mujeres para los Demás (Spanish); Men and women for others
- Established: 1590 as Colegio Santo Tomas de Aquino 1906 as Instituto San José 1920 as Instituto de Ciencias
- Rector: Guillermo Prieto Salinas, S.J.
- Teaching staff: 210
- Grades: Preschool to 12
- Gender: Coeducational
- Enrollment: 2,944
- Colors: Red and White
- Mascot: Wolves
- Nickname: Ciencias
- Website: Instituto de Ciencias

Instituto de Ciencias in Zapopan, Jalisco, Mexico, claims its origin to 1591 when the Jesuits first opened a college in Guadalajara. It was then called the Jesuit college of Saint Thomas Aquinas, but was closed with the suppression of the Jesuits in 1767. It reopened in 1906 under the name San José College and in 1920, after the Mexican Revolution, was named Instituto de Ciencias de Jalisco, in the metropolitan area of Guadalajara.

== See also ==
- List of Jesuit sites
