= Escuela Sierra Nevada =

Information
- Funding type: Private school
- Established: 1950; 75 years ago
- Color(s): Green
- Website: esn.edu.mx/es/enlightenment/

Escuela Sierra Nevada is a private school in the Mexico City metropolitan area. It was established in 1950 and serves preschool through high school.

== Colors ==
Green

== Campuses ==
Preschool through high school:

- Interlomas - Huixquilucan, State of Mexico
- San Mateo - Naucalpan, State of Mexico

Preschool through elementary school:

- Esmeralda - Atizapán, State of Mexico (its secondary school will open in August 2022 starting with 7th Grade).
- Lomas - Two locations in Lomas de Chapultepec, Miguel Hidalgo

Center for low income students in preschool through elementary school (opened 2003):

- Centro Educativo Nemi - Colonia del Valle, Benito Juárez
