= Colegio Amaranto =

Private school in Baja California Sur, Mexico

Location
- Cabo San Lucas; Mexico
- Coordinates: 22.9099°N 109.8614°W

Information
- Type: Private school
- Website: www.amaranto.edu.mx

Colegio Amaranto Los Cabos, BCS is a private school in Cabo San Lucas in Los Cabos, Baja California Sur, Mexico.

It includes levels preschool to high school (preparatoria).

It is associated with the Colegio Olinca of Mexico City.
