= Colegio Nuevo México =

Grupo Educaativo is an organization that operates private schools in the Mexico City metropolitan area. The schools are:

- Colegio Anglo Mexicano de Coyoacán in Colonia San Francisco Culhuacán, Coyoacán
- Colegio Anglo Americano de Coyoacán in Fraccionamiento Paseos de Taxqueña, Coyoacán
- Colegio Anglo Americano Lomas in Colonia Jesús del Monte, Huixquilucan, State of Mexico, near Lomas de Chapultepec

Colegio Anglo Mexicano serves pre-school through senior high school (preparatoria or bachillerato). The Colegio Anglo Americano Lomas campus serves preschool through high school while the Coyoacán campus serves preschool and primary school.
