= Academia Maddox =

Private school in Naucalpan, Mexico

Coordinates: 19.520615°N 99.239009°W

- Naucalpan, State of Mexico; Mexico

Information
- Established: 1912; 114 years ago
- Founder: Jessie Sampson Maddox
- Affiliation: Legion of Christ Semper Altius School Network

Academia Maddox is a private school in Naucalpan, State of Mexico, in the Mexico City metropolitan area. It is also part of the Legion of Christ Semper Altius School Network, the school divides boys and girls into separate classrooms until middle school, since in preparatory the classrooms become mixed. It serves preschool through middle school, and Prepa Anahuac preparatory.

It was founded by Jessie Sampson Maddox in 1912; she came to Mexico in 1910. Academia Maddox opened its girls' section in 1924.
