= Escuela Normal Miguel F. Martínez =

Normal school in Monterrey, Mexico

- Type: Normal School
- Established: 23 November 1870; 155 years ago
- Rector: Noe Carmona Moreno (director en funciones)
- Students: 1,200 approximately
- Location: Monterrey, Nuevo León, Mexico
- Colors: Red, Yellow, Black and blue
- Mascot: Lince
- Website: www.enmfm.edu.mx

The Escuela Normal Miguel F. Martínez is a normal school in Monterrey. José Eleuterio González, then substitute governor of Nuevo León founded the school in 1870.

In 1941, the name is changed to Escuela Normal Miguel F. Martínez in honor to Miguel Filomeno Martínez, third director of this school from 1881 to 1883.

In 1970 was named "Centenaria and Benemérita", by the local congress.

The school offers three bachelor's degrees: elementary, kindergarten and gymnastic's education.
