= Colegio Cristóbal Colón (El Salvador) =

Private school in El Salvador

Coordinates: 13.7151°N 89.2099°W

Colegio Cristóbal Colón ("Christopher Columbus School") is a private school in Colonia El Roble, San Salvador, El Salvador. It serves age 3 through bachillerato (senior high school).
