= Colegio México Bachillerato =

Information
- Website: colegiomexicobachillerato.maristas.edu.mx

Colegio México Bachillerato, A.C. is a secondary school, with junior high school (secundaria) and senior high school (preparatoria or bachillerato) classes.
