= Academic Unit Preparatoria Hermanos Flores Magón =

High school belonging to the Autonomous University of Sinaloa

Coordinates: 24.8094°N 107.3993°W

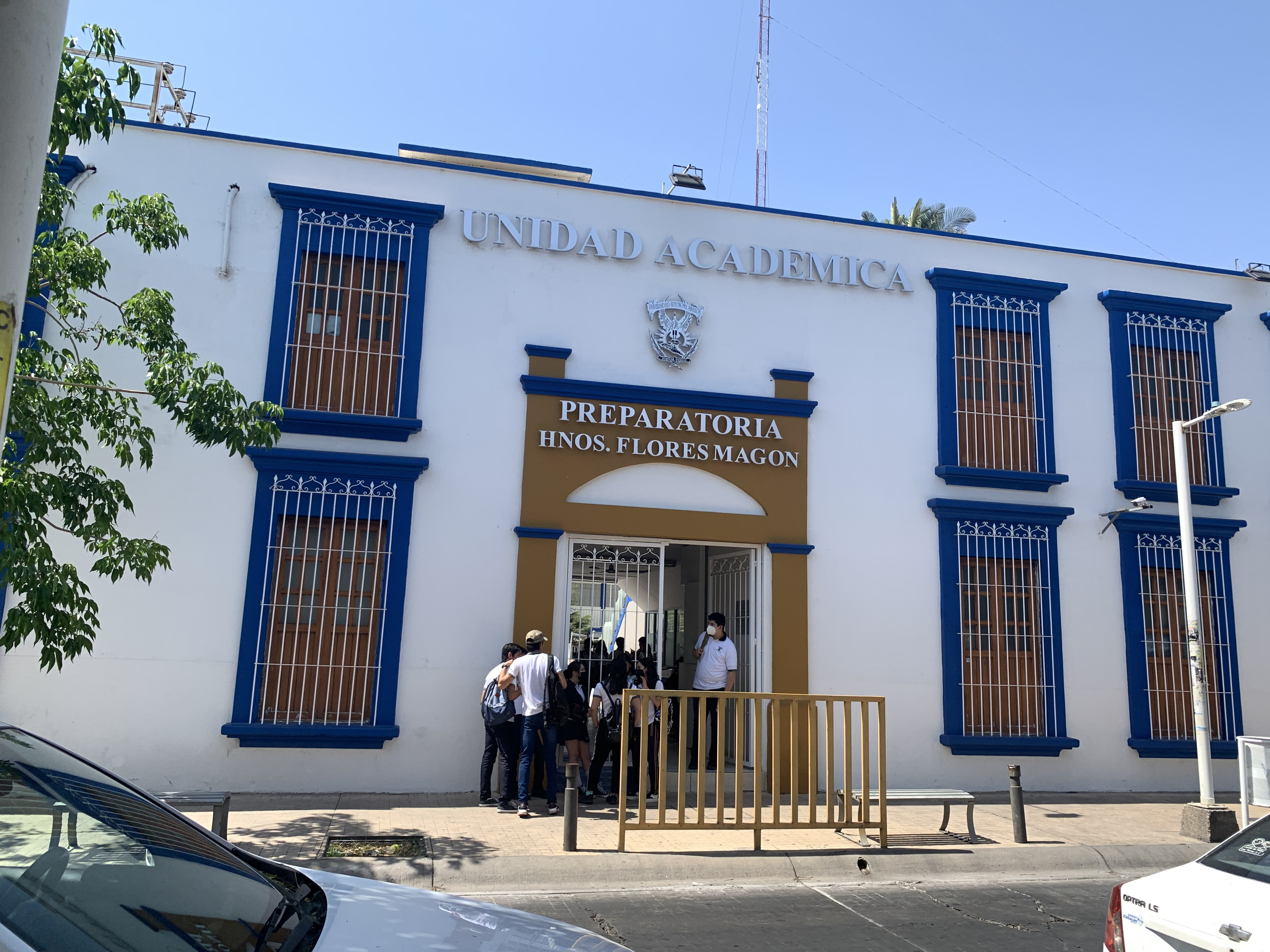
- Type: public
- Location: Culiacán Rosales, México
- Campus: urban
- Website: https://nms4.uas.edu.mx/floresmagon/

The Unidad Académica Preparatoria Hermanos Flores Magón is a high school belonging to the Autonomous University of Sinaloa. It is located in the historic center of the city of Culiacán Rosales, Sinaloa, Mexico, and is considered the best academic unit of the state university.
