= Green Hills School =

Coordinates: 19.3229°N 99.2370°W

Green Hills School Spanish: Colegio Green Hills, S.C.

Information
- Motto: Veritatis Lucem Quaerentes (Seeking the Light of Truth)
- Established: 1962; 63 years ago
- Language: English
- Website: colegiogreenhills.com

Green Hills School (Spanish: Colegio Green Hills, S.C.) is a private school in the Mexico City metropolitan area. Founded in 1962, the school serves levels preschool through preparatoria (high school). The South Campus is in Col. San Jerónimo Lídice in Magdalena Contreras, Mexico City while the north campus is in Atizapán, State of Mexico.
