= Colegio Olinca =

Private school system in Mexico

Instituto Educativo Olinca, S.C., operating as the Colegio Olinca ("Olinca School"), is a private school system in Mexico. It serves preschool, kindergarten, primary, middle school (secundaria), and high school (preparatoria).

It has three campuses: Altavista in Álvaro Obregón, Mexico City; Periférico in Coyoacán, Mexico City; The Colegio Amaranto Los Cabos, BCS is associated with the school.
