= Lomas Verdes =

Human settlement in Mexico

- Neighborhood
- Interactive map of Lomas Verdes
- Coordinates: 19.48°N 99.23°W
- Country: Mexico
- State: Edomex
- Municipality: Naucalpan

Population (2015)
  - Total: 37,285

Lomas Verdes is a middle- and upper-middle-class neighborhood located in Naucalpan, State of Mexico, northwest Mexico City. The community was developed in the late 1960s and is near Ciudad Satélite (which was founded in 1957). Lomas Verdes means "Green Hills" in Spanish, as the terrain had a set of smooth hills covered with green grass and other wild vegetation, which nowadays are totally covered with houses.

The neighborhood consists of several sections: La Alteña I, II and III, La Soledad, Misiones, and the sections I, II, III, IV, V and the now in construction sección VI. To the North, Lomas Verdes borders the county of Atizapán de Zaragoza, to the south and the west with other neighborhoods of Naucalpan, and to the east with the ancient colonial town of Santa Cruz del Monte.

After its foundation, Lomas Verdes was a so-called "bedroom community", as the majority of the residents commute México City (7 miles far away) for work. Today, twenty years after its founding, there is a strong commercial and services sector in the zone. The most important artery serving the area is the Súper Avenida Lomas Verdes, which connects the neighborhood with the Periferico and the elevated highway that leads directly into the heart of Mexico City. As with all Latin American urban developments, the increasing growth of the population and the unplanned urban strategy overwhelmed the infrastructure and now traffic jams, accidents, air pollution, and chaotic expansion have reduced the quality of the life of the inhabitants.

== Education ==
The Colegio Alemán Alexander von Humboldt operates its Campus Norte/Campus Nord (formerly Campus Lomas Verdes) in this area. The kindergarten and primary levels occupy one building, and the secondary and preparatory levels occupy another building.

There is also an Universidad del Valle de México (UVM) campus. and the elementary school Colegio Cristóbal Colón.
