= Cobach =

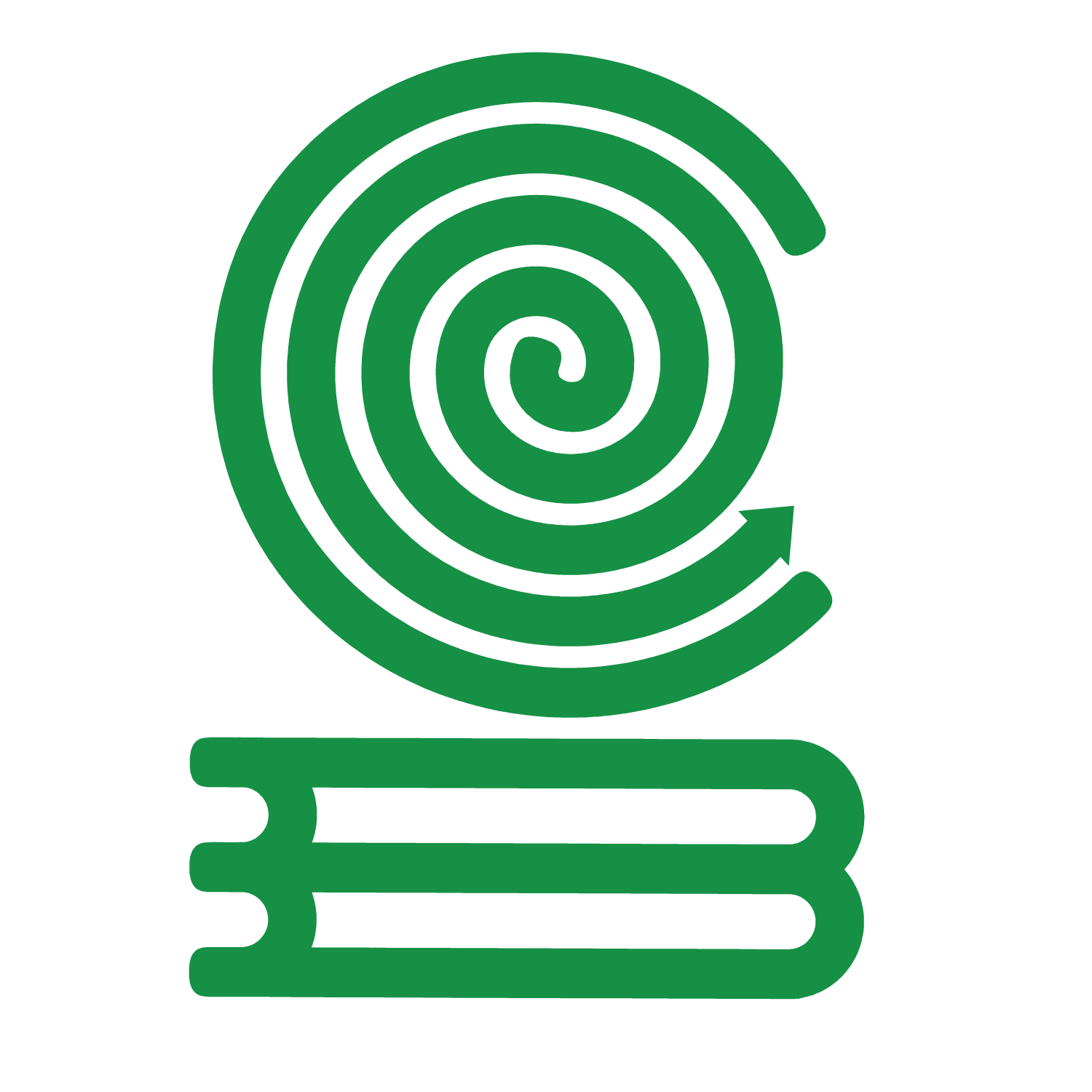
Colegio de compu logo.

COBACH (Colegio de Bachilleres) is a public secondary education institution in Mexico associated with SEP working under the SEMS (Subsecretaría de Educación Media Superior). It is a decentralized public institution created by presidential decree on September 26th, 1973. It has 20 high school campuses in Mexico City and 27 in different states through the Mexican Republic.

== History ==
It was established in Mexico City in 1973 during Luis Echeverría government to help cover the demand of high schools that offered a public service to workers and students therefore 20 campuses were opened in Mexico City and also a program (sistema abierto/open education) for workers who could not attend school normally helping them to get a higher school diploma by taking exams after they studied text books at home or at work.

The first three campuses were established in Chihuahua offering two shifts, a morning shift from 7 am to 1 pm, and an afternoon shift from 3 pm to 9 pm.

== Campuses ==
| State | Name |
|---|---|
| Baja California Norte | COBACH BC |
| Baja California Sur | COBACH BCS |
| Campeche | COBACH del estado de Campeche |
| Mexico City | Colegio de Bachilleres |
| Chiapas | Colegio de Bachilleres de Chiapas |
| Coahuila | Colegio de Bachilleres del estado de Coahuila |
| Chihuahua | Colegio de Bachilleres del estado de Chihuahua |
| Durango | Colegio de Bachilleres del estado de Durango |
