= Colegio Alemán Alexander von Humboldt (Mexico City) =

German-language school network in Mexico

Coordinates: 19°30′52″N 99°15′52″W

Colegio Alemán Alexander von Humboldt, A. C. (German: Deutsche Schule Mexiko-Stadt) is a network of German-language primary and secondary schools based in Greater Mexico City.

There are three campuses under a single school board, with each campus acting autonomously. As of 2010, the institution together is the largest German school outside of Germany.

== History ==
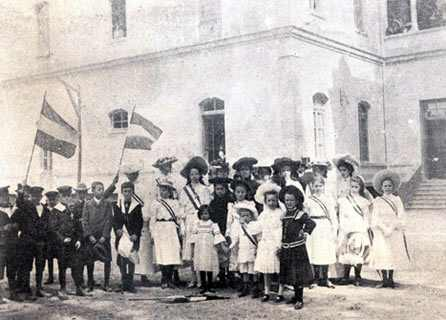
Students at the school, 1903

The school was established in 1894, situated on Canoa Street in Mexico City. By 1900, the number of students was approaching 300, including students from outside the German community.

The school included German, Mexican, and other teachers and was modeled after other German schools abroad. There were multiple divisions, and Division A had facilities tailored for female students.

In 1940, a campus in Tacubaya was opened, and by 1968 the Civil Association "Alexander von Humboldt" is created, named after the German naturalist and explorer. The institution had incorporated itself into the Mexican Educational System, so students could obtain either Mexican or German certificates. By 1970, two additional campuses were opened and over 1000 students attended the school.

The association currently has 3 main campuses, and additionally a Kindergarten, and an Elementary School. The unaffiliated Club Alemán de México is used as a cultural and athletic facility by the German community.

In 2014 there was controversy over bullying in the Lomas Verdes campus.

== Language of classes ==
Most subjects are taught in German, and children are required to be bi-lingual, unless they are starting Kindergarten.

== Campuses ==
Campuses in Greater Mexico City
North/Lomas Verdes (blue), Poniente/West/La Herradura (green), South/Xochimilco (Yellow)

The following campuses are in Greater Mexico City:

- Campus Poniente/Campus West (formerly Campus La Herradura): Kindergarten, Elementary, Middle, and High School (or "Abitur" by German standards).
  - There are two campuses. One, covering kindergarten, primary, secondary, and preparatory levels, is located in Huixquilucan, State of Mexico. The other, the Plantel Lomas Kindergarten Prado Norte, is located in Lomas de Chapultepec, Miguel Hidalgo, Mexico City.
- Campus Sur/Campus Süd (formerly Campus Xochimilco): Xochimilco, Mexico City: Kindergarten, Elementary, Middle, and High School (or Abitur by German standards).
  - Kindergarten and Primary are in Plantel Tepepan in Colonia Tepepan, and Secondary and Preparatory are in Plantel La Noria in Colonia Huichapan. There is also a Kindergarten in the Plantel Pedregal in Jardines del Pedregal, Álvaro Obregón.
- Campus Norte/Campus Nord (formerly Campus Lomas Verdes), Kindergarten, Elementary, Middle, and High School
  - The kindergarten and primary grades and the secondary and preparatory grades are in two separate campuses in Naucalpan de Juárez, State of Mexico.

It previously had a campus at 43 Benjamin G. Hill in Hipódromo Condesa, Cuauhtémoc, in what is now a part of Universidad La Salle.

== See also ==
- German immigration to Mexico
