= The Wingate School (Mexico) =

British school in Mexico

Information
- Established: August 2016; 8 years ago
- Founder: Thomas Wingate
- Age: 3 to 18

The Wingate School (TWS) is a British international private school in the Mexico City metropolitan area opened in August 2016 serving ages three through 18.

The first campus to open will be the Virreyes campus, in Lomas de Chapultepec, Miguel Hidalgo, while the Huixquilucan campus, serving the Interlomas area, will open in 2017. The Interlomas campus will serve early years through secondary school while the Virreyes campus will only serve primary school.

== History ==
The Wingate School's Headteacher and key founder is Thomas Wingate, a British man who has lived in Mexico for various periods since 1986. Wingate, a resident of Mexico married to a Mexican former diplomat, had previously taught in Mexico, the United States and England.

== Curriculum ==
The school's primary curriculum is the International Primary Curriculum (IPC) which will lead onto the IGCSEs and full IB Diploma Programme.
