= Bachillerato Anáhuac Campus Monterrey =

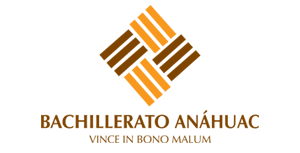
- Batallón de San Patricio, San Pedro Garza García N.L. Mexico

Information
- Type: Preparatory school
- Motto: "Vince in Bono Malum" comes from the latin and means has the meaning "Overcome evil with good".
- Opened: 1968
- Principal: F. Guillermo Meade L.C.
- Enrollment: 160
- Colors: Orange, Black and White
- Mascot: El Bachi Warrior
- Newspaper: The Orange

The Bachillerato Anáhuac Campus Monterrey preparatory school, is a branch of the catholic school program of Universidad Anáhuac. It is located at Batallón de San Patricio, at San Pedro Garza García N.L., Mexico.

The Bachillerato Anáhuac has nearly 200 students. The school uses a bilingual system (60% English 40% Spanish), and teaches German, French and Chinese as well.
