= Naucalpan =

Municipality in State of Mexico, Mexico

- Municipality
- Naucalpan de Juárez
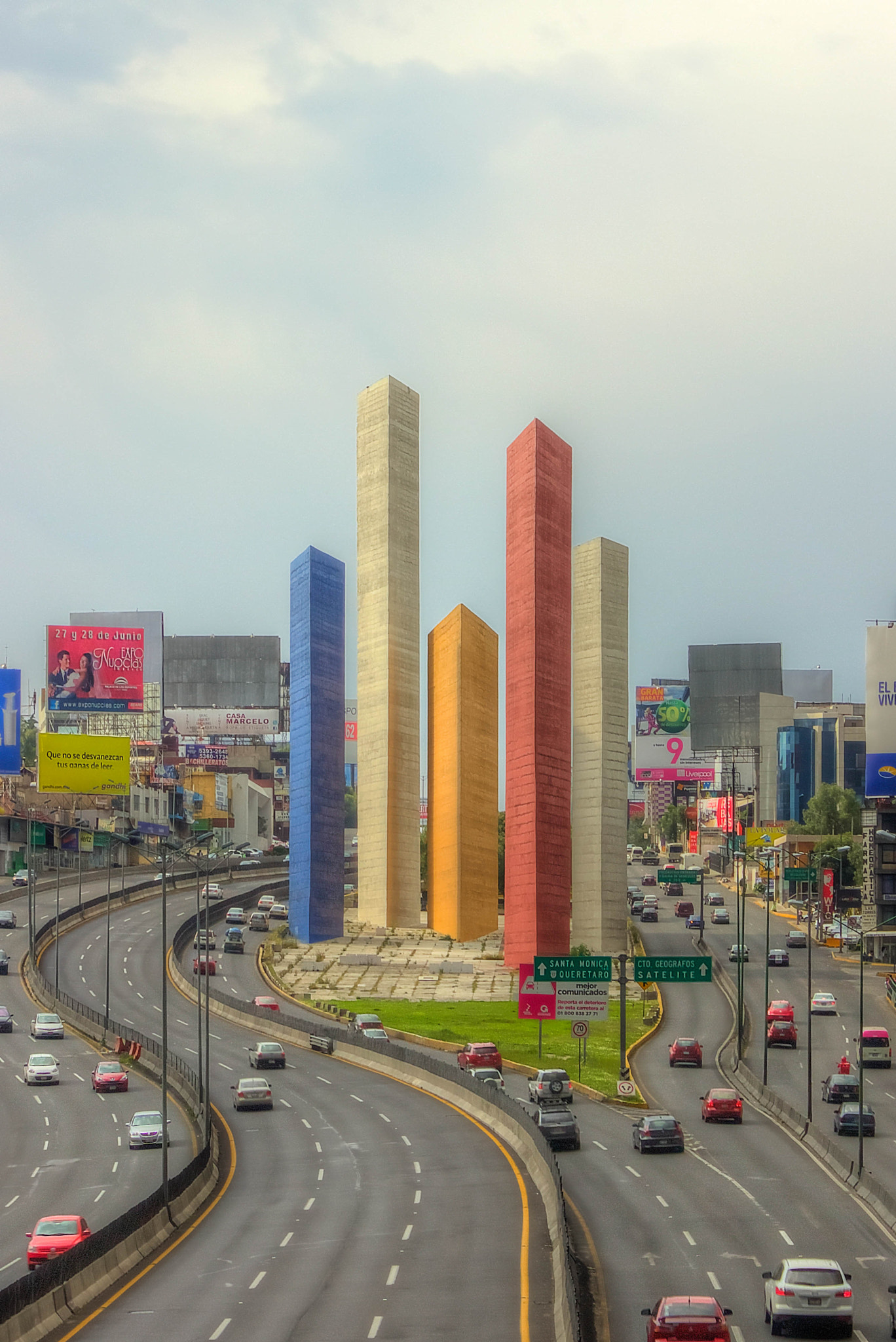
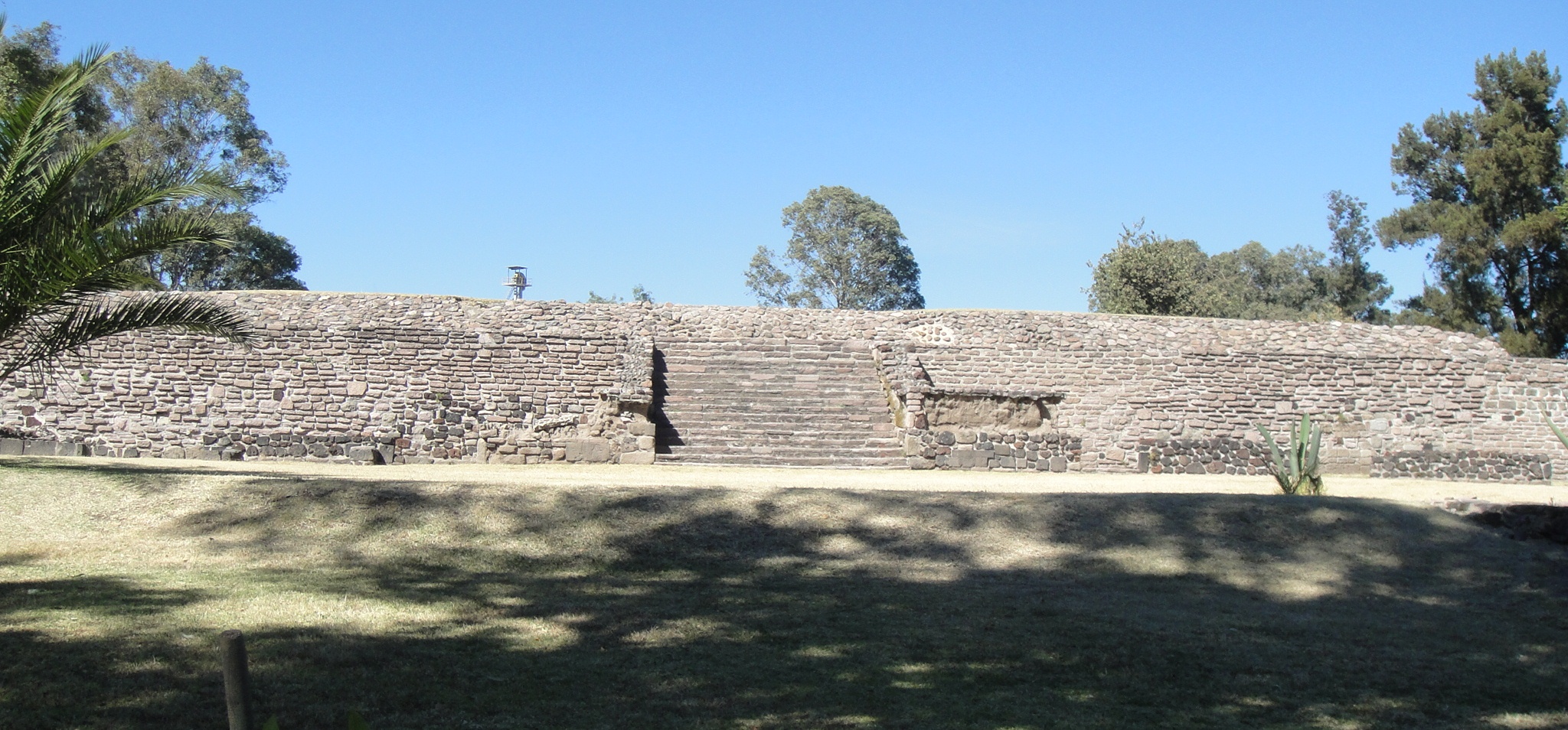
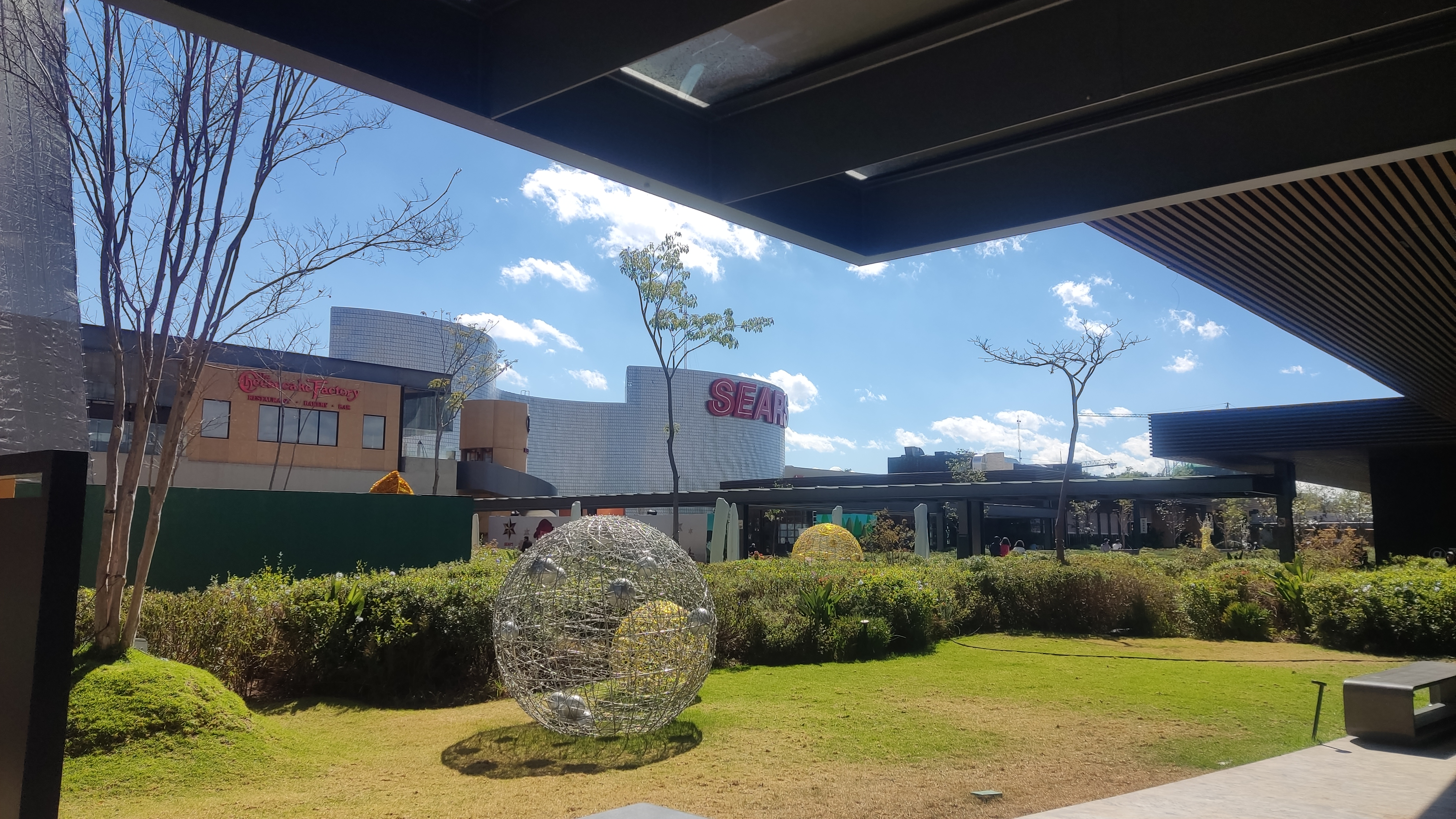
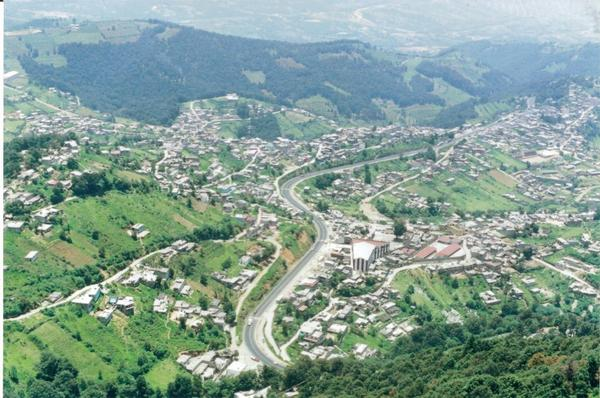
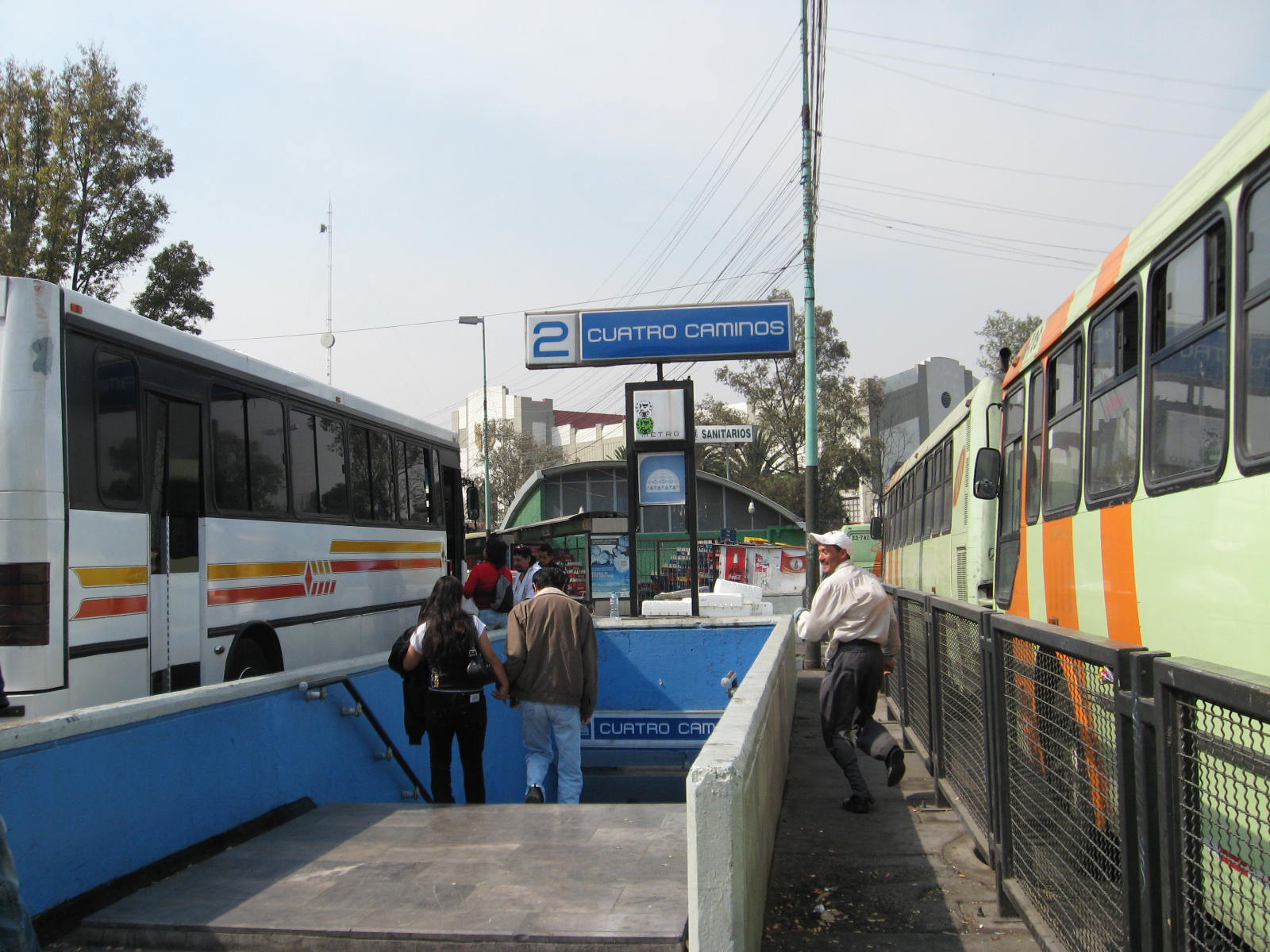
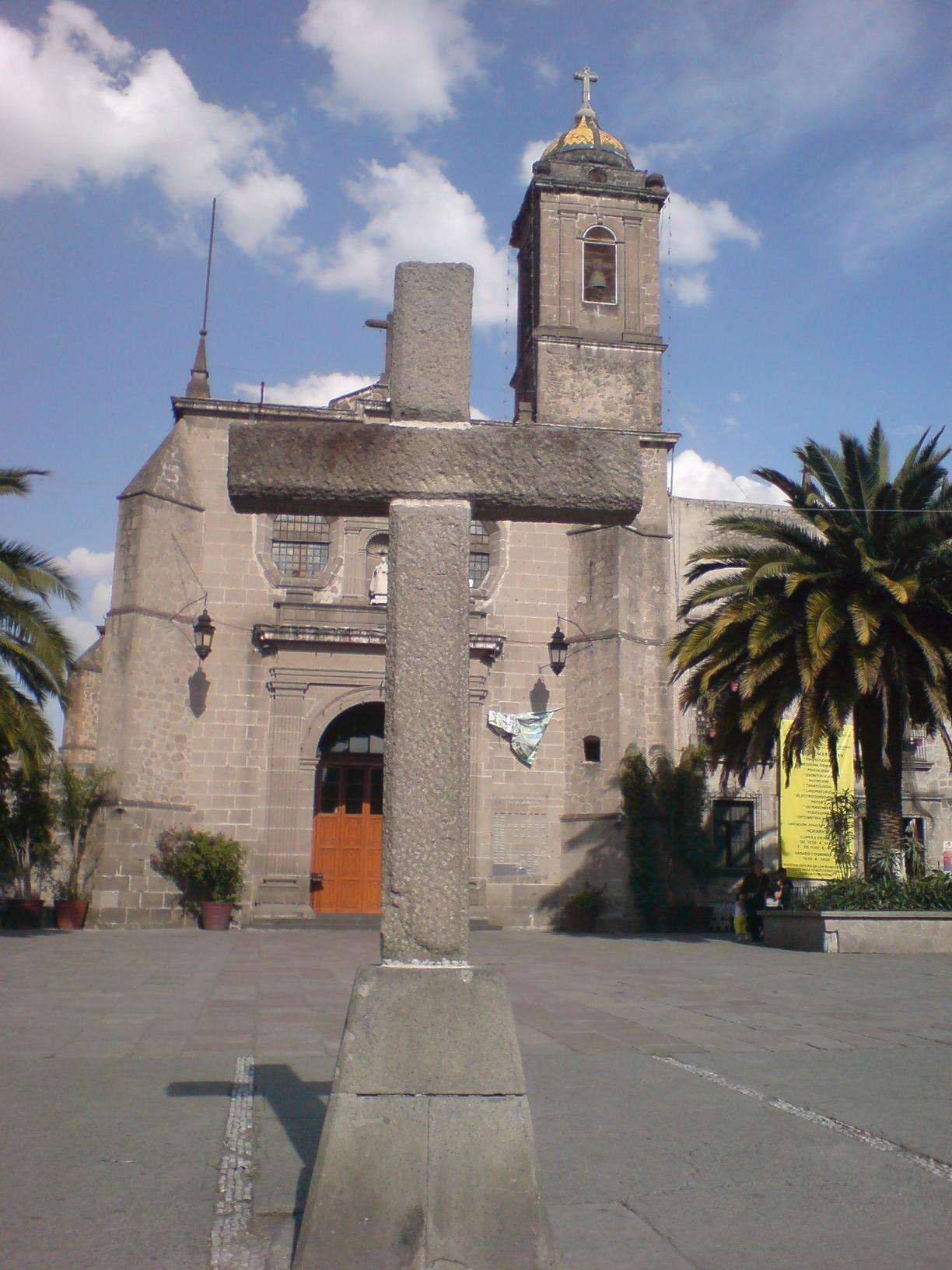
- Clockwise, from top: Torres de Satélite, Plaza Satélite, Cuatro Caminos metro station, Basilica of Our Lady of Remedies, San Francisco Chimalpa, El Conde

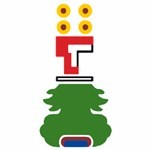
- Coat of arms

- Location of Naucalpan in the State of Mexico
- Coordinates: 19°28′31″N 99°14′16″W
- Country: Mexico
- State: State of Mexico
- Region: Naucalpan
- Metro area: Greater Mexico City
- Municipal Status: January 1, 1826
- Municipal Seat: Naucalpan de Juárez

Government
  - Type: Ayuntamiento
  - Municipal President: Isaac Montoya

Area
  - Municipality: 156.63 km^{2} (60.48 sq mi)
  - Water: 1.56 km^{2} (0.60 sq mi)
- Elevation (of seat): 2,300 m (7,500 ft)

Population (2020 census)
  - Municipality: 834,434
  - Density: 5,400/km^{2} (13,900/sq mi)
  - Seat: 776,220
- Time zone: UTC-6 (Central)
- Postal code (of seat): 53000
- Area code: 55
- Demonym: Naucalpense
- Website: Official website (in Spanish)

Naucalpan, officially Naucalpan de Juárez, is one of 125 Municipalities of Mexico State, and is located just northwest of Mexico City. The municipal seat is the city of Naucalpan de Juárez, which extends into the neighboring municipality of Huixquilucan.

The name Naucalpan comes from Nahuatl and means "place of the four neighborhoods" or "four houses." Juárez was added to the official name in 1874 in honor of Benito Juárez. The history of the area begins with the Tlatilica who settled on the edges of the Hondo River between 1700 and 600 B.C.E., but it was the Mexica who gave it its current name when they dominated it from the 15th century until the Spanish conquest of the Mexica Empire. Naucalpan claims to be the area where Hernán Cortés rested on the "Noche Triste" as they fled Tenochtitlan in 1520, but this is disputed. It is the home of the Virgin of Los Remedios, a small image of the Virgin Mary which is strongly associated with the Conquest and is said to have been left here.

Today, the city of Naucalpan is actually larger than the municipality itself, with part of it extending into neighboring Huixquilucan Municipality, although there are other towns in within the municipality of Naucalpan which are outside the city of Naucalpan. It is a major center of industry in Mexico. It is, however, best known as the location of Ciudad Satélite, a development from the 1960s, the neighboring Lomas Verdes, and the site of the Toreo de Cuatro Caminos bullring, which was demolished in the 2010s to build the Toreo Parque Central mixed-use development. The only unurbanized areas of the municipality are the Los Remedios National Park and a number of ejidos, but the lack of housing has put serious pressure on these areas.

== History ==
The Valley of Mexico, of which Naucalpan is a part, has been inhabited by humans for over 20,000 years. The history of Naucalpan begins with a group called the Tlatilca who settled on the edges of the Hondo River between 1700 and 600 BCE, in what is now modern Nacaulpan, Totolinga and Los Cuartos. During the Preclassic period (1400 to 1300 BCE) a group of Olmecs arrived and had significant influence on the dominion of Tlatilca. Later, Tlatilca was also heavily influenced by the Teotihuacan civilization. Between 1000 and 1200 CE the Chichimecas conquered the Tlatlica and deposed their monarchy. The Pyramid del Conde was built during this time, located in what is now the El Conde neighborhood. Later in the pre-Hispanic period, the area was governed by Tlacopan (Tacuba) and became ethnically dominated by the Otomi. Starting from 1428, the area was under the dominion of Tepanece de Atzcapotzalco, which was later conquered by the Aztec Triple Alliance, who gave it the name of Naucalpan. On 30 June 1520, Hernán Cortés fled Tenochtitlan toward what is now Naucalpan. According to legend, he wept under a Montezuma Cypress tree, which is believed by some to be located at the foot of the Otocampulco Mountain here. This is called the "Noche Triste" or "Night of Sorrows". There is dispute as to whether this tree is located here or in Popotla. Another legend states that during the flight of the Spanish, an image of the Virgin Mary was left under a maguey plant, where the Sanctuary of Los Remedios is today.

In 1521, the fall of Tenochtitlan brought the area under Spanish control. Hernán Cortés conceded governorship of this area to Isabel Moctezuma and Alonso de Grado, naming it San Bartholome Naucalpan. Evangelization of the native peoples was carried out by the Franciscans who built the monastery of San Gabriel de Tacuba and a number of historic churches such as the Church of San Francisco de Assisi, Church of the Inmaculada Concepcion and the Church of Los Remedios. In 1574, the Temple of San Bartolome Naucalpan was built, with the towers constructed later in 1629. The area was important in colonial times for the mining of building stone, sand and gravel which was used for many constructions in Mexico City including the Mexico City Metropolitan Cathedral and the National Palace.

In 1810, the Virgin of the Remedios was brought here from the Mexico City Cathedral, dressed as a general. She was proclaimed as a patroness of Spain and the "guardian of the Spanish Army." Locally, she was called a "gachupina" (slang word for Spaniard). She eventually became the patroness of Naucalpan, with 450th anniversary of her finding celebrated in 1990. Her sanctuary was built in 1875.

In 1821, brothers Joaquin and Bernardo Miramín founded the newspaper "Diario Militar." One of the writers for this paper was José Joaquín Fernández de Lizardi, popularly known as "El Pensador Mexicano" (The Mexican Thinker) . The town remained a dependency of Tlalnepantla for much of the 19th century even though it had become an independent municipality in 1826. Industrialization began here with the founding of the Hilados and Tejidos de Rio Hondo factory, inaugurated by Benito Juarez in 1869. In 1899, the territory of Santa Cruz del Monte was added to the municipality. During the Mexican Revolution, Zapatista leaders Rafael Carrillo and Roman Diaz operated in the nearby Chimalpa mountains against federal forces.

The Toreo de Cuatro Caminos was inaugurated in 1947. It was the icon of the city for many years, as well as the symbol of Naucalpan's Metro station, Cuatro Caminos. The building was torn down in 2009 to make way for a commercial complex.

Naucalpan was officially declared a city in 1957, and the founding of Ciudad Satélite occurred in the same year. The project was completed in 1963. Its five signature towers were designed by Luis Barragán and Matias Goeritz. By 1975, Naucalpan had become one of the most industrialized cities in Mexico.

== The city ==
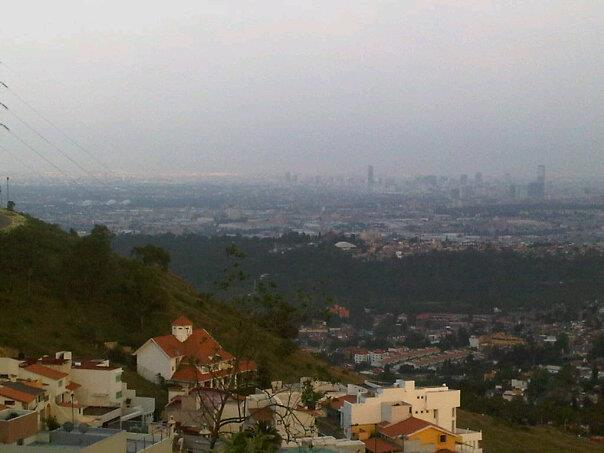
Landscape of Mexico City seen from Pedregal de Echegaray

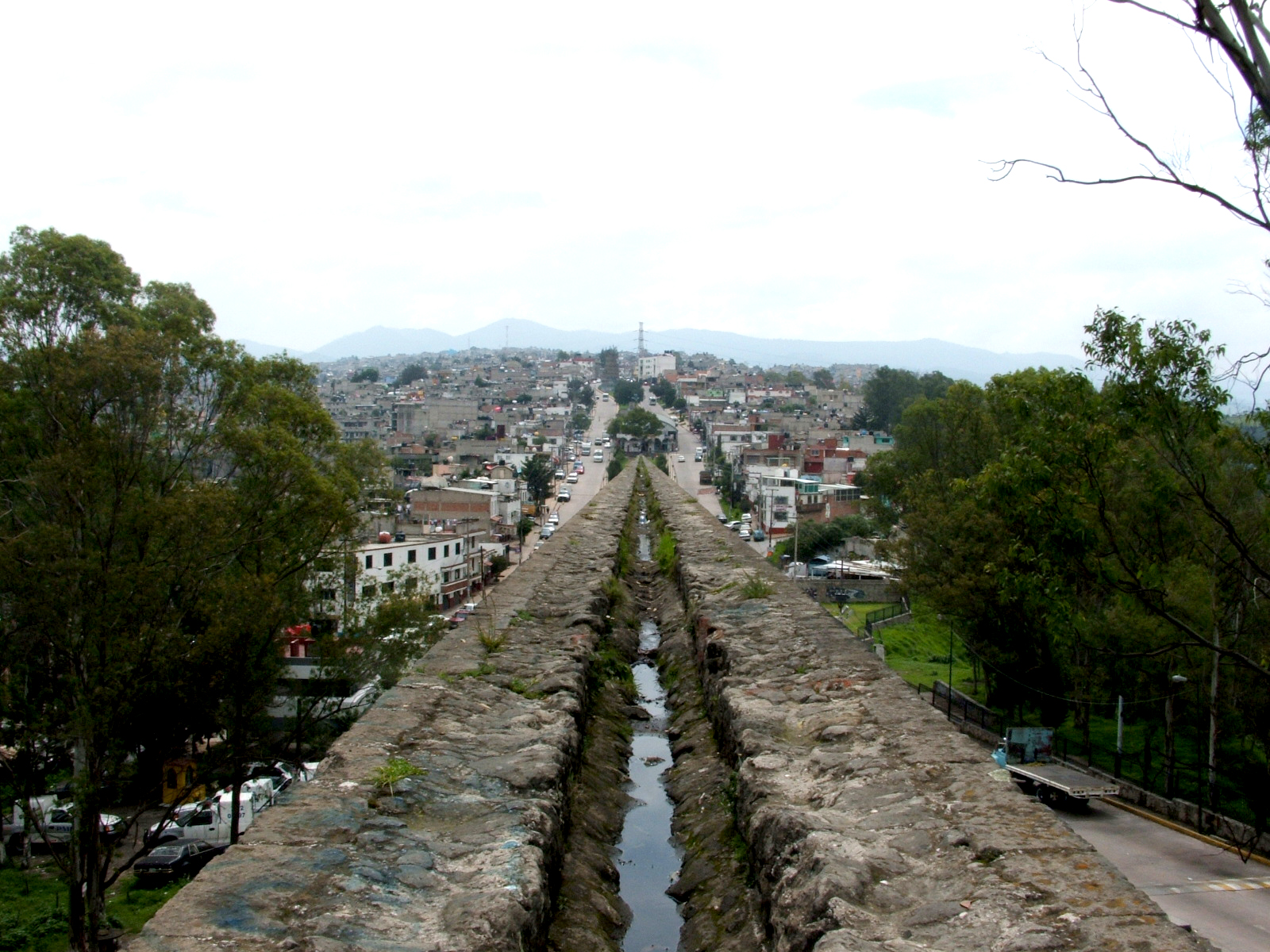
Acueducto de los Remedios passing through Chamapa low income suburb

The city of Naucalpan extends into neighboring Huixquilucan Municipality. At the 2010 census its total population was 913,681 inhabitants, with 792,211 of these in Naucalpan Municipality and 121,470 in Huixquilucan Municipality. Since cities, or localities, have no separate government, the two parts are governed from their respective municipalities. Within Naucalpan Municipality only the Los Remedios National Park and several ejidos remaining mostly unurbanized. Over 95% of the municipality's population lives in the city proper. The municipality consists of 119 neighborhoods in the city proper, 18 small villages, 71 residential developments and two rural housing developments. Because of the growth of its industry, Naucalpan is one of the most important municipalities in the country. Products manufactured here include foodstuffs, drinks, tobacco, clothing and textiles, wood products and paper, metals and chemicals. Industrial parks include Alce Blanco, Atoto, Industrial Naucalpan, La Perla and Tlatilco.

The municipality is part of Greater Mexico City and in the Valley of Mexico, sharing the air quality and other environmental problems that are prevalent in this region. Naucalpan already participates in the "Hoy No Circula" program, which restricts the use of private automobiles in Mexico City and some adjoining areas during the week and is considering extending restrictions to Saturdays as well. Its subsoil is considered to be gravely polluted, mostly due to the Bordo Poniento landfill and the sinking of the subsoil due to the over pumping of groundwater and the dumping of untreated wastewater. In addition, many small businesses such as brick making operations, public restrooms and restaurants flagrantly violate sanitation and environmental laws. However, automobiles account for 70% of the air pollution. Stronger environmental regulations have been enacted and enforced, but this has led to the abandonment of the municipality by larger industries who have relocated to the north and west. Over 200 companies have relocated from here and neighboring municipalities Tlalnepantla and Ecatepec. Industries which have left Naucalpan include metals, cement, glass-works and others that use a large quantity of energy. About twenty percent of manufacturing facilities have closed their doors and six industrial parks are empty. In addition to environmental regulation, other actors behind this rising land and rental prices, economic slowdown and competition from Asia. Several major roadways pass through the city and municipality, which connect the Mexico City area to parts north and west, as well as other parts of the metropolitan area. The northern section of the Anillo Periférico passes through Ciudad Satélite. There have been plans to add a second level to this roadway, but local residents have been working against it. One of the concerns is that the new roadway will damage the nearby Torres de Satélite. The recently built Viaducto Bicentenario highway, linking Mexico City with western Mexico State passes through Naucalpan and was the first section to begin operations. This section connects the Lomas Verdes section with Cuatro Caminos at the border of Mexico City. The construction of these roadways is projected to make changes in the urban landscape of the city, attracting projects such as office buildings and commercial centers. A number of projects are already in the works. The goal is to build areas here similar to Santa Fe and Interlomas. Naucalpan is strongly dependent on cars and other motorized transportation. Efforts have been made to promote bicycle use such as bike paths and free bicycle loans, but they have not been successful.

One of the best-known areas of Naucalpan is Ciudad Satélite with its signature Torres de Satélite sculpture. Ciudad Satélite was one of a number of large scale projects undertaken by the federal government in the Mexico City area in the 1950s and 1960s, along with the Conjunto Habitacional de Tlaltelolco and the Ciudad Universitaria. From the late 1940s to early 1950s, Mexico City began to grow towards the northern limits of the Federal District, and compelling urbanization into adjoining Mexico State. One of the projects conceived for the suburban zone of Naucalpan was a development called Ciudad Satélite. The project was headed by architect Luis Barragán in 1958 and financially backed the Banco Internacional Hipotecario. The city's design and coordination was supervised by architect Mario Pani. It was designed to be a suburban community with a "green corridor" (highway lined by parks) connecting it to Mexico City proper. Attractive land prices created a boom market soon after the first units were sold in the mid 1960s, and over the next ten years, the green corridor disappeared. In addition to being a major bedroom community, it has been a major shopping district since the opening of the Centro Comercial Satélite in 1962.

The Torres de Satélite were constructed by architects Luis Barragan and Matias Goeritz with the collaboration of painter Jesús Reyes Ferreira in the mid 20th century. The five sculptures form prisms that range in height from thirty to fifty-two metres (98 to 171 feet). They are located in the traffic circle of one of the busiest roads in the State of Mexico. They were constructed to be symbols of the vanguard of world class design in Mexico and as a "welcome" of the expansion of Greater Mexico City to Naucalpan. The Torres de Satélite have been catalogued by UNESCO as architectural heritage. The second best-known landmark in Naucalpan was recently demolished. The Toreo de Cuatro Caminos (lit. the Bullring of the Four Roads) was built in the 1940s in what was a hacienda. Over the years, the city built up and the area around the bullring became a major local transportation hub. The northwest end of the Mexico City Metro Line 2 ends here, at a large bus station which is only a couple of blocks from the Toreo. At the Toreo itself, fifteen local bus routes as well as buses to Toluca and other points west converge here. These buses clog the surrounding streets of Ingenieros Militares, Rodolfo Gaona and San Mateo. The domed roof of this bullring was a symbol of the city for many years, but in 2009, the demolition of this building began to make way for a commercial complex. Most of the bus routes have been relocated for the demolition and reconstruction, and a bus terminal is being considered for the area. Despite the loss of the building, the symbol of Metro Cuatro Caminos will remain a depiction of the dome.

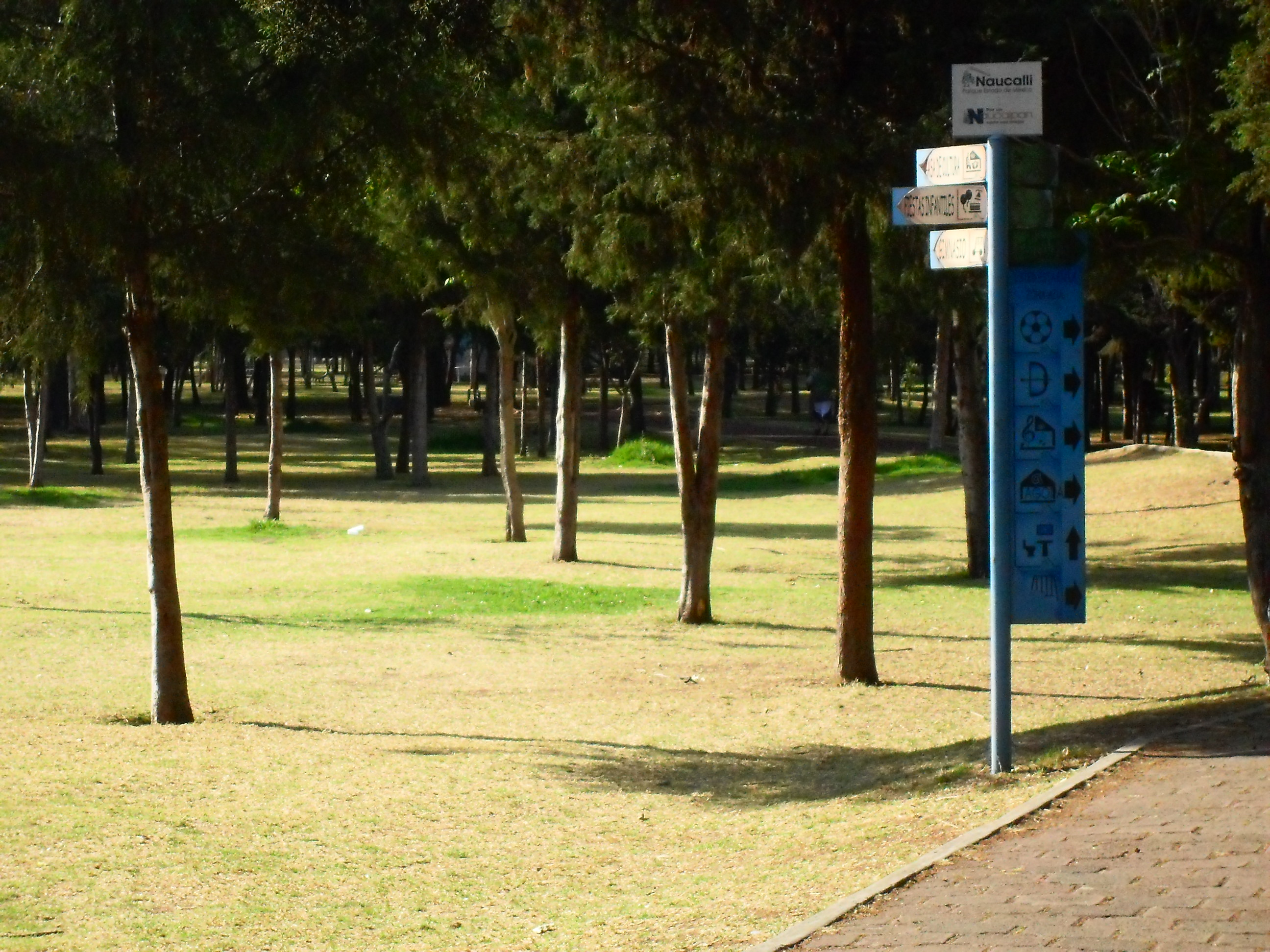
Naucalli Park

In addition to Ciudad Satélite and the Toreo, other attractions here include the Cerro Moctezuma, the Villa Alpina, the Conde y Tlatilco Pyramid, a Mexica shrine in the city center and the Museum of Naucalpan. Historic structures from the colonial period include the Caracoles, the Aqueduct, the Bridge of Santa Cruz, the arches of the Sanctuary of Los Remedos, the Parish of San Luis Tlatilco. In the city center is the Museum of the Tlatilca Culture. Arena Naucalpan is a major arena in Naucalpan, Estado de México. It's long been a home for lucha libre, and is currently the central arena of IWRG. The arena hosts a lucha libre show each Thursday and Sunday. The Naucalli Park occupies an area of forty three hectares and is a major natural area filled with trees and other vegetation. It also contains recreational and sporting facilities such as skating rinks, bike paths, playgrounds (naucalli) and the Casa de Cultura Naucalli. The Symphony Band of Naucalpan regularly plays here at its own concert hall.

The city hosts the campuses of a number of institutions of higher education. The Colegio de Ciencias y Humanidades Plantel Naucalpan is a technical college associated with UNAM. It was opened in 1971 as part of the decentralization of UNAM's activities. Most of the majors are related to science and technology. Other educational institutions which have facilities in Naucalpan include the Universidad Nuevo Mundo; Universidad de Norteamérica, the Colegio en Alta Dirreción Empresarial, and the Universidad del Valle de Mexico. The Universidad Autónoma del Estado de México has plans to build a campus here in 2010 as part of its expansion efforts.

On Pafununcio Padilla there are two five-story buildings which are locally called "Los Esqueletos" or The Skeletons. These are two buildings which have been abandoned for thirty five years when their owner died intestate during construction. Since then they have had problems with indigents and vandalism, causing fear in neighbors. By law, the buildings pass on to the owner's sons, but they have never done the paperwork to claim them.

== The Virgin of Los Remedios ==
The patroness of the city and municipality of Naucalpan is the Virgin of Los Remedios. She is a small image of the Virgin Mary, measuring 27 cm (11 in) in height. This image is strongly linked with the Spanish Conquest, especially the episode known as the "Noche Triste" or Night of Sorrows. It is said he led his men to an indigenous religious sanctuary to escape the Aztecs, stopping here on their way to Otumba. According to legend, one of Cortés' soldiers, Gonzalo Rodríguez de Villafuerte, was carrying a small image of the Virgin Mary and hid her under one of the maguey plants in order to retrieve and pay homage to her later if he survived. During a later battle in this area, the Spanish reported seeing a young girl throwing dirt into the eyes of the Aztecs to help the Spanish. Another legend states that this image appeared at the Cerro de los Pajaros, where a chapel was built in 1574, which later was expanded in 1628 with a vaulted roof and cupola. Being connected with the Conquest, this image of the Virgin is considered to be "Spanish" and a patroness to them and to the indigenous who adopt Spanish ways. She is considered one of the Virgins who correlate with the four cardinal directions (in her case, the west), along with the Virgins of Tepeyac, of Piedad and de la Bala.

Despite her importance to the area, this image was kept at the Mexico City Cathedral until 1810. In that year, she was moved to her sanctuary in Naucalpan, dressed as a general. She was proclaimed as a patroness of Spain and the "guardian of the Spanish Army." The purpose of this was to counter Miguel Hidalgo's use of the Virgin of Guadalupe as a symbol of his independence movement.

This image was center of one of the first annual processions to be held in Mexico, which went from the Church of Santa Veracruz in Mexico City to her home sanctuary in Naucalpan. Her feast day is still celebrated on September 1, On this day, the sanctuary is profusely decorated with white flowers, which includes a carpet of flower petals in the San Miguel Arcangel esplanade. This sanctuary is not located in the city proper, but in the mountainous western part of the municipality where the Los Remedios National Park stands. Her feast day is celebrated with dances knowns as "Los Apaches," "Los Moros," "Chichimecas" and "Pastorcitas". The 450th anniversary was celebrated in 1990.

== The municipality ==
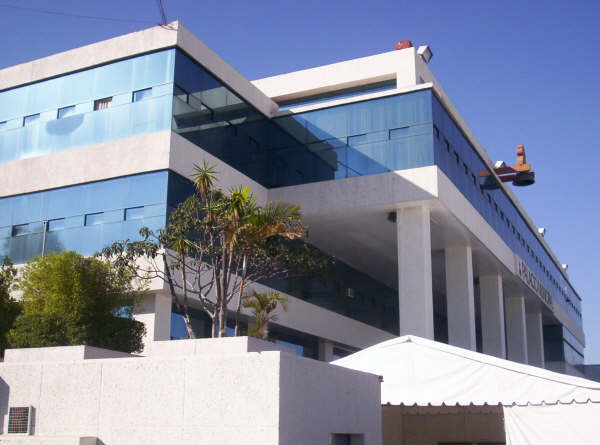
Municipal palace

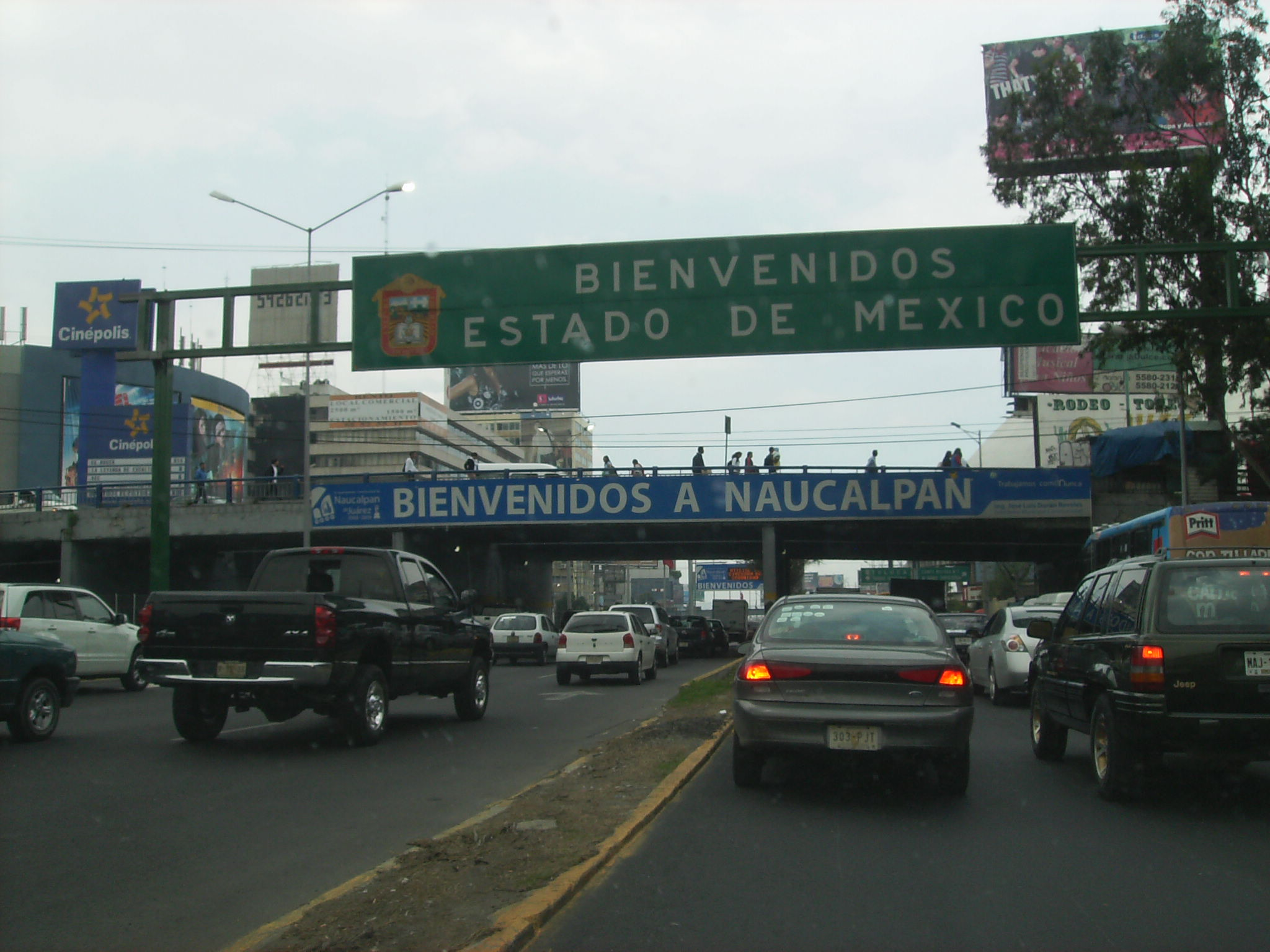
Entrance from Mexico City into Naucalpan through Periferico avenue

The part of the city that lies within Naucalpan Municipality is nearly co-extensive with the municipality, with only the Los Remedios National Park and several ejidos remaining mostly unurbanized. The municipality consists of 233 neighborhoods in the city proper, 18 small villages, 71 residential developments and two rural housing developments. Together, these localities cover an extension of 149.86 km^{2}. The municipality is located in the Valley of Mexico, just northeast of Mexico City and northwest of Mexico State capital of Toluca. The municipality borders the municipalities of Atizapan de Zaragoza, Tlalnepantla de Baz, Jilotzingo, Huixquilucan de Degollado, Xonacatlán and Lerma with the Mexico City Federal District to the east and southeast.

The highest peaks are the Organo and La Malinche mountains at 3,650 metres (11,980 feet) above sea level. Other notable elevations include la Cantera, El Cedral, San Joselito, La Plantación and Peña del Rayo. The main rivers through the area include the Totolina, San Lorenzo and Los Remedios. Water supply for the municipality is supplemented by 28 deep wells, and an aqueduct that brings water from the Lerma River. It has a temperate climate with a rainy season in the summer and early fall. Freezing temperatures occur between November and February, but the last significant snowfall occurred in 1967. Vegetation outside the city proper consists of conifers and oaks, with orchards of fruit trees such as plums, apples and pears. Most wildlife consists of small mammals such as squirrels and opossums along with small reptiles and birds. However, deforestation is a major problem. There are eight ejidos, five of which are dedicated to agriculture and the rest to other activities. Agricultural production includes animal feed, barley, beans, corn, wheat, avocados, peaches and cactus fruit. Livestock includes cattle, pigs, sheep and domestic fowl. There is also some trout farming. Building stone, sand and gravel are still mined here. However, the overwhelming majority of the municipality's economic activity is the industry and commerce in the city proper.

The major un-urbanized area of the municipality is the Los Remedios National Park, located in the far west. This park was established by decrees in 1938 by the federal government with an area of 400 hectares. Within its borders is the Sanctuary of the Virgin of Los Remedios, a colonial era aqueduct and a pre-Hispanic archeological zone with a Chichimeca temple. All of these are located in and around the mountain called Cerro Moctezuma. The site was an Aztec observatory and is also believed to be where Cortés and his men rested after fleeing Tenochtitlan.

The aqueduct is 500 metres (1,600 feet) long and consists of fifty arches which measure 16 metres (52 feet) high and extend 1.7 metres (5 feet 7 inches) into the ground. The first stage was built in 1616 under viceroy Diego Fernandez de Cordoba with the objective of bringing water to the Sanctuary of Los Remedios from a spring at the village of San Francisco Chimalpa. This water was also used to irrigate fields in the villages of San Bartolomé, Santa Maria Nativitas and Santa Cruz. The aqueduct is mostly of clay pipes with two large spiral towers to release air. These towers flank the Sanctuary of the Virgin of Los Remedios and are nicknamed "caracoles" (snails) By 1764, the amount of water this system delivered was no longer enough and viceroy Joaquín de Monserrat had the arched system built, which was finished in 1765. Eventually, this system could not deliver water and became simply an architectural monument.

Seventy five percent of the original surface of the park now has illegal settlements, including settlements which have been authorized by local authorities. While these settlements can be confiscated and destroyed under federal law, this has not happened. The federal environmental agency Profepa has received complaints about the most recent invasions into the park area, which as felled dozens of trees. The agency has responded with inspections of plans by a developer to build two subdivisions near the colonial era aqueduct to verify if the land is private or public. One reason for this is that the park lacks conservation plans, fences and other means to fend off development efforts. The illegal settlements and development have also affected adjoining ejido land that adjoin the park. This and the fact that housing is now starting to encroach the archeological zone has prompted the involvement of INAH and the organization of neighboring communities to protest.

=== Towns and villages ===
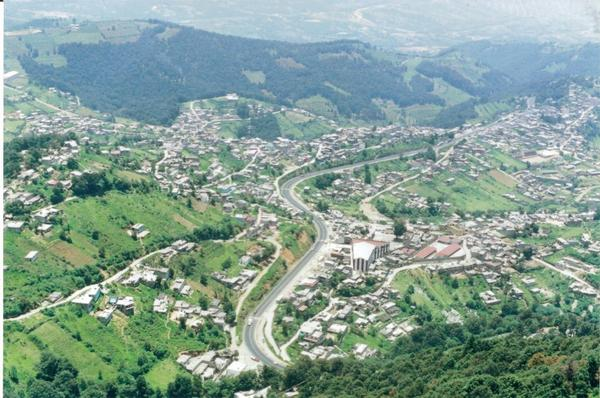
San Francisco Chimalpa village

The largest localities (cities, towns, and villages) are:

Name	2010 Census Population
Naucalpan de Juárez	792,211
San Francisco Chimalpa	8,953
Ejido de San Francisco Chimalpa	4,349
Santiago Tepatlaxco	3,864
San José Tejamanil	2,578
Total Municipality	833,779

== Economy ==
Naucalpan is one of the most powerful municipalities in the country; in the area next to Mexico City there's many little and medium-sized businesses; such as pharmaceutical labs, spare parts businesses and chemical products and textile manufacturing factories.

The commercial and services sector is important, in the last 40 years it's grown. Its thrive begun with the opening of the Plaza Satélite mall in 1971. In 2007 another mall was built: La Cúspide Sky Mall. Acrópolis Ciudad Comercial, located in Naucalpan, opened in 1990 and closed permanently in 1994.

According to the Reyes-Barreto-Rodríguez (2007) study of the wealth distribution in the State of Mexico, Naucalpan de Juárez in the year 2000 generated enough wealth to cover the necessities of their citizens twice, in contrast to other municipalities that only create one third of the needs of their citizens in a year. Naucalpan and its neighbor Ecatepec host the 19% of the population of the State of Mexico and both produce a bit more than 22% of the income of the state.

== Twin towns – sister cities ==
City	State/Province	Country	Year
Des Moines	Iowa	United States	1987
Calgary	Alberta	Canada	1994
Anyang	Gyeonggi	South Korea	1997

== Geography ==
=== Climate ===
Subtropical highland variety of the oceanic climate exists in elevated portions of the world that are within either the tropics or subtropics, though it is typically found in mountainous locations in some tropical countries. The Köppen Climate Classification subtype for this climate is "Cwb" (oceanic subtropical highland climate).

Climate data for Naucalpan (1991–2020 normals, extremes 1969–present)
Month	Jan	Feb	Mar	Apr	May	Jun	Jul	Aug	Sep	Oct	Nov	Dec	Year
Record high °C (°F)	33 (91)	33 (91)	39 (102)	36 (97)	39 (102)	36 (97)	31 (88)	35 (95)	31 (88)	33 (91)	34 (93)	32 (90)	39 (102)
Mean daily maximum °C (°F)	23.1 (73.6)	25.3 (77.5)	27.2 (81.0)	28.4 (83.1)	28.1 (82.6)	26.5 (79.7)	25.1 (77.2)	25.3 (77.5)	24.8 (76.6)	24.7 (76.5)	24.3 (75.7)	23.5 (74.3)	25.5 (77.9)
Daily mean °C (°F)	13.5 (56.3)	15.7 (60.3)	18.0 (64.4)	19.0 (66.2)	19.0 (66.2)	18.0 (64.4)	17.0 (62.6)	17.3 (63.1)	17.0 (62.6)	16.6 (61.9)	15.6 (60.1)	13.9 (57.0)	16.7 (62.1)
Mean daily minimum °C (°F)	3.9 (39.0)	6.2 (43.2)	8.8 (47.8)	9.7 (49.5)	9.8 (49.6)	9.4 (48.9)	8.9 (48.0)	9.3 (48.7)	9.2 (48.6)	8.5 (47.3)	7.0 (44.6)	4.4 (39.9)	7.9 (46.2)
Record low °C (°F)	−6 (21)	−4 (25)	−1 (30)	0 (32)	1 (34)	0 (32)	2 (36)	1 (34)	1 (34)	−2 (28)	−4 (25)	−6 (21)	−6 (21)
Average precipitation mm (inches)	7.0 (0.28)	7.8 (0.31)	10.1 (0.40)	21.4 (0.84)	65.5 (2.58)	142.5 (5.61)	192.5 (7.58)	191.2 (7.53)	163.9 (6.45)	71.2 (2.80)	12.1 (0.48)	4.6 (0.18)	889.8 (35.03)
Average precipitation days (≥ 0.01 mm)	1.9	2.2	3.1	5.2	11.8	16.6	20.6	20.7	17.4	9.4	2.8	1.1	112.8
Average relative humidity (%)	62.3	56.1	51.7	53.0	58.8	68.2	74.4	75.2	77.3	74.1	69.7	64.8	65.5
Mean monthly sunshine hours	250.8	250.2	284.2	294.6	296.8	253.7	253.2	254.0	225.7	235.9	235.4	251.0	3,085.5
Source 1: Servicio Meteorológico Nacional
Source 2: Weather.Directory

== Education ==
International schools include:

- Colegio Alemán Alexander von Humboldt Campus Norte/Campus Nord (formerly Campus Lomas Verdes)
- Greengates School
- British American School

Other schools:

- Irish Institute (Instituto Irlandés)
- Escuela Sierra Nevada San Mateo Campus
- Colegio Cristóbal Colón
- Colegio Miraflores
- Academia Maddox
- Justo Sierra Plantel San Mateo

Colleges and universities:

- School of High Studies (FES) Acatlán (Facultad de Estudios Superiores Acatlán) National Autonomous University of Mexico
- College of Science and Humanities Naucalpan campus (Colegio de Ciencias y Humanidades plantel Naucalpan) National Autonomous University of Mexico

== See also ==
- Huixquilucan de Degollado
- Tecamachalco, State of Mexico - a neighborhood of Naucalpan city
