= Colegio El Roble Interlomas =

Private school in Huixquilucan, State of Mexico

Colegio El Roble Interlomas is a private school in Col. Hacienda de las Palmas, Huixquilucan, State of Mexico. It serves preschool through high school (preparatoria).
