= Colegio Oxford Bachillerato =

High school in Álvaro Obregón, Mexico City

Coordinates: 19.3336°N 99.2481°W

- Álvaro Obregón, Mexico City; Mexico

Information
- Website: www.oxfordmexico.com

Colegio Oxford Bachillerato is a senior high school on the property of Universidad Anáhuac del Sur, in colonia Torres de Potrero, Álvaro Obregón, Mexico City.
