= Colegio Miraflores =

Mexican network of private schools

Coordinates: 19.429749°N 99.253476°W

Colegio Miraflores Colegio Miraflores is a network of private schools located in Mexico.

== Schools ==
State of Mexico:

- Colegio Miraflores (Nacaulpan)
- Colegio Miraflores Ángel Matute (Nacaulpan) - Serves preschool (preescolar) through senior high school (bachillerato)
- Colegio Miraflores Toluca (Toluca) - Serves preschool through middle school (secundaria)

Guanajuato:

- Colegio Miraflores León - Preschool through senior high

Morelos:

- Colegio Miraflores Cuernavaca - Preschool through senior high

There are also affiliated schools in Cape Verde and Ourense, Spain.
