= Irish Institute =

- Instituto Irlandés

Location
- Naucalpan, Mexico State; Mexico
- Coordinates: 19.4255807°N 99.24014729999999°W

Information
- Type: Independent, Private
- Campus: Urban
- Website: irlandesmexico.com

The Irish Institute (Spanish: Instituto Irlandés) is a Catholic private school in Greater Mexico City. Operated by the Legionaries of Christ, the grounds, located in Naucalpan, State of Mexico, have separate areas for boys and girls, plus a third one for the coed preschool. The school levels in total range from preschool to bachillerato, equivalent to the American K-12. The Irish Institute is also present in other cities of Mexico, including: Nuevo Laredo and Monterrey.

== History ==
The Legionaries of Christ set up the Irish Institute in 1965 as a way to offer a bilingual Catholic education in Spanish and English. The school is taught by members of the Legionaires and includes English speaking Catholic priests being assigned to the Institute.

== Students ==
Jason Berry and Gerald Renner, the authors of the 2004 book Vows of Silence: The Abuse of Power in the Papacy of John Paul II, said that the students came from the "superrich of Mexico City". Paul Lennon, a former member of the Legionaries quoted in the book, wrote that "The family names [of the students] were like a Who's Who of Mexican people." Historically many students arrived in cars driven by bodyguards for protection against kidnapping. Every December, the school holds a traditional pilgrimage walk to the Catholic shrine of Our Lady of Guadalupe in the Basilica of Our Lady of Guadalupe.

The students of Irish Institute have a rivalry with Cumbres Institute, which is also run by the Legionaries of Christ. In 2017, Irish Institute students and their bodyguards crashed a Cumbres Institute end of term graduation party after a video mocking the school was made, requiring intervention from the Mexico City Police and the Mexico City government.
