= Centro Universitario Anglo Mexicano =

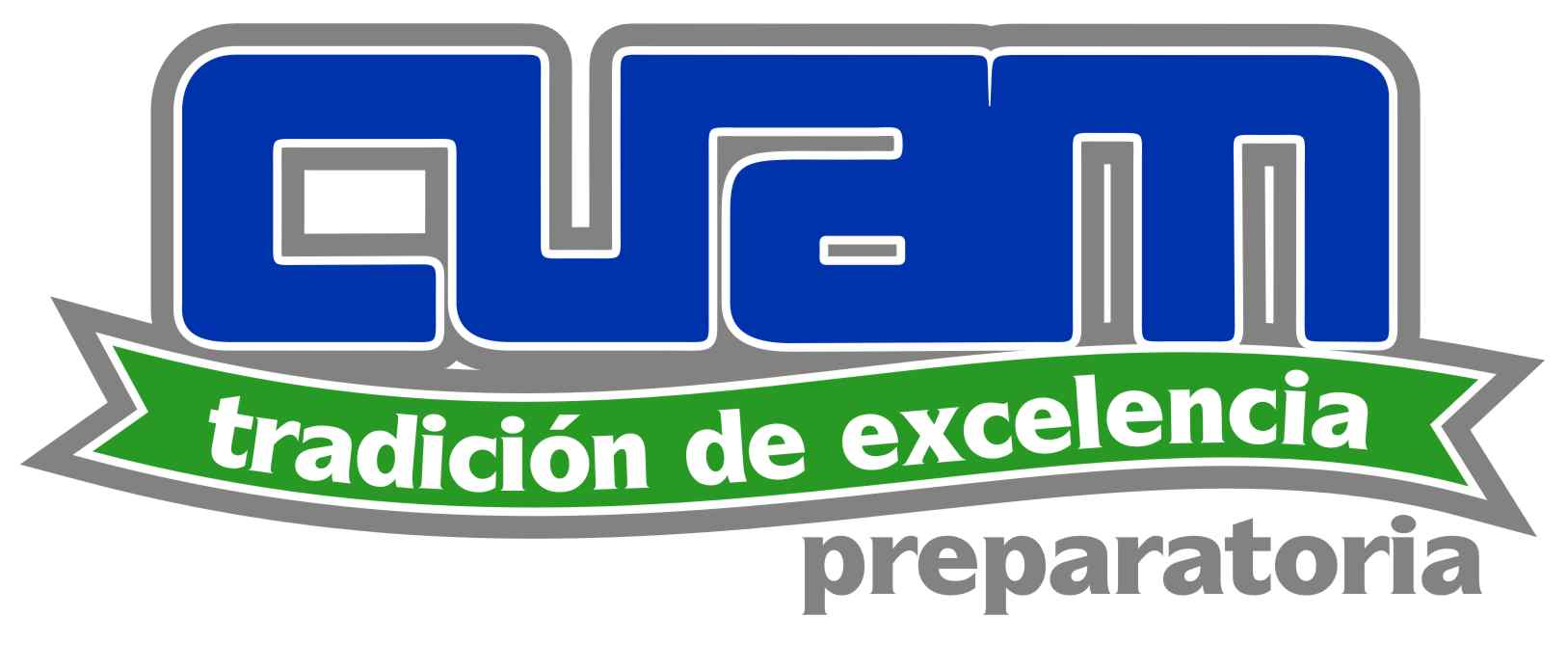

Location
- Mexico City, Cuernavaca, Cancún, Mérida

Information
- Type: Private junior high school and high school affiliated to UNAM
- Motto: “Tradición de excelencia” (Tradition of Excellence)
- Established: September 4, 1974
- Principal: Luis Adolfo Gaspar (Mexico City) (Morelos) (Cancún)
- Athletics: Cheerleading, soccer, basketball, volleyball
- Mascot: “Cuamito” (Tiger)
- Website: www.cuam.edu.mx

Centro Universitario Anglo Mexicano (English: Anglo Mexican University Center) is a Mexican preparatory school affiliated with the Universidad Nacional Autónoma de Mexico (UNAM), as well as a group of private Secondary and Preparatory Schools across Mexico. It was inaugurated on 1974 in Mexico City, in the neighbourhood of San José Insurgentes.

CUAM has four establishments; one is located in Mexico City, and the rest in regional Mexican cities Cuernavaca, Mérida and Cancun. There are also three CEAM secondary schools located in the cities as well, with the exception of Cancun.

== History ==
Members of Queen Elizabeth's elementary school, including the principal, some professors and a group of businessmen, decided to create a bilingual non-religious private high school affiliated to National Autonomous University of Mexico (UNAM).

The Anglo Mexican HS, CUAM HS was inaugurated on September 4, 1974, in the residential San José Insurgentes neighborhood, in Mexico City, starting at that time, with 108 students, most of them Queen Elizabeth's School graduates. Ten years later, the school moved to a new location in Las Aguilas neighbourhood in Álvaro Obregón", which was designed to host larger facilities. In 1985, the first regional school was launched in the resort town of Cuernavaca; CUAM Morelos, started with over 120 students, rapidly consolidating as an important school in the city. In 1989, after a State's government invitation to improve academic standards and increase college oriented competitive students, CUAM Acapulco was inaugurated, serving a population of over 150 students in high school and adding a Jr. high school level for the first time.

In 1999, CUAM Águilas was transformed into CEAM Mexico junior high school. The fourth regional CUAM was also opened in the city of Cancún, which offered kindergarten through high school, K-12, through an alliance with Centro Escolar BALAM. In 2004, CUAM acquired a property formerly owned by Mexican comedian Mario Moreno "Cantinflas", which became CEAM Morelos Jr. High School, just across the street from CUAM Morelos.

In 2009, CUAM Mexico migrated to a new facility next to CEAM Mexico, in Calzada de Las Aguilas 350, leaving behind its traditional location for the last 33 years in the street of Sagredo.

Due to rising urban violence and crime, CUAM Acapulco closed its operations in 2009. Before that, CUAM Acapulco was a top school in the state. It carried one of the highest regional official rankings and consistently won Guerrero's State academic Olympics.

In 2012, CUAM acquired Queen Elizabeth School, to integrate Kindergarten and Elementary school, now including K-12 grade in Mexico City.

On 2016 CEAM Jr. Highschool and CUAM Highschool started academic activities in the city of Merida, Yucatan.

In 2019, CUAM became a member of the Southern Association of Independent Schools (SAIS) of the United States, with the objective of guaranteeing compliance with international teaching-learning practices such as training for teachers and administrators, achieving in 2022, accreditation as an international quality school.
