= Colegio Cristóbal Colón (Mexico) =

Private school in Mexico City

Colegio Cristóbal Colón A.C. (CCC; "Christopher Columbus School") is a PK-12 private school in the Lomas Verdes area of Naucalpan, State of Mexico, in Greater Mexico City. Its serves levels preescolar (preschool) through preparatoria (senior high school).

The school was first established in 1938. The land for the current campus was acquired in 1970. It began coeducational classes in the 1996–1997 school year.
