= CECyT 2 Miguel Bernard Perales =

Preparatory school of the National Polytechnic Institute

Coordinates: 19.4527°N 99.2142°W

Centro de Estudios Científicos y Tecnológicos (CECyT) No. 2 "Miguel Bernard Perales"
- Other names: Vocacional 2, Voca 2
- Motto: Formando Mejores Tecnicos cada día
- Motto in English: Forming the Best Technicians Every Day
- Type: Public
- Established: 1936
- Principal: José Luis Morales Gaspar
- Location: Av Nueva Casa de Moneda #133, Lomas de Sotelo, Miguel Hidalgo, 11260, Mexico City, Mexico
- Colors: Green & white
- Nickname: Cheyennes
- Website: www.cecyt2.ipn.mx

The Center of Science and Technological Studies No. 2 "Miguel Bernard", (CECyT 2), is a high school belonging to National Polytechnic Institute (IPN), located in Mexico City.

== Name ==
The CECyT 2 has had different names since its inception. The first of the first names that this institution would adopt is Pre-vocational School 2 of Arts and Crafts, later the name would be changed to Vocational School of Mechanical and Electrical Engineering (EVIME).

Around 1960, it acquired the Professional School of Engineering and Physical-Mathematical Sciences, these names would give rise to know these schools as "vocational" or "voca". In 1972 the name would radically change, becoming the Center for Scientific and Technological Studies No. 2, four years later the name of an illustrious person in the history of the IPN, the engineer Miguel Bernard Perales, was added.

== History ==
=== Antecedentes ===
In 1936, the Centro Industrial de Trabajadores (Workers' Industrial Center) was established. In 1960, as part of a reorganization of programs, four new Vocational Schools of Engineering and Physical and Mathematical Sciences were created, each educating students for two years. In 1972, the vocational schools began serving students for three years and were redesignated as Centers of Science and Technological Studies (Centro de Estudios Científicos y Tecnológicos, CECyT).

In 1974, the General Technical Advisory Council of the IPN approved the renaming of the CECyT schools after historic figures; CECyT 2 was named for Miguel Bernard Perales, who was the director general of the IPN in 1937 and 1938.

In 2011, a new aeronautical lab was dedicated at CECyT 2, named for Elsa Carmina Cortés Vorrath, the first female pilot in the Mexican Navy.

In 2018 the school turned 80 years old with which a series of events were held which ended with the placement of a commemorative plaque in Plaza Osoriona.

=== 1968 Student Movement ===
In the Plaza de La Ciudadela –the same place that 55 years before was covered with corpses during the so-called Tragic Ten–, in the center of Mexico City, students from the Isaac Ochoterena High School (incorporated into the UNAM) and from the vocational schools 2 and 5 of the National Polytechnic Institute (IPN) dispute an American football game and, at one point, spurred on by members of two gangs –Los spiders and Los Ciudadelos–, they stage a brawl.

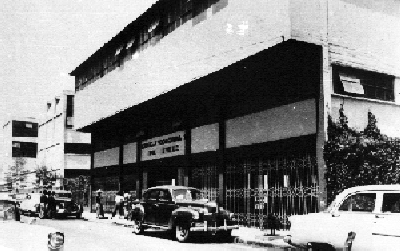
CECyT 2 in the 60's

Subsequently, the facilities of Isaac Ochoterena High School, located on the corner of Lucerna and Versalles, a few blocks from La Ciudadela, are attacked by polytechnic students and suffer damage. The police do not intervene.

Tuesday July 23 The students of Isaac Ochoterena, in revenge, stone Voca 2. In response, those of Voca 2 and 5 march to it to settle accounts with their adversaries.

IPN students, led by leaders of the National Federation of Technical Students (FNET), of a pro-government court, meet with Rodolfo González Guevara, secretary general of the Department of the Federal District, to announce that the following day they will hold a march in protest against the police aggression against Voca students 5.

In the Faculty of Political and Social Sciences of the UNAM, during the development of an assembly, the students surprise a military policeman with printed flyers of the Faculty of Philosophy, students' homes and dates of meetings in support of the hunger strike that carries out Demetrio Vallejo, leader of the railroad workers.

=== 89 years putting technology at the service of the country ===
The year 2025 marked the 89th anniversary of the study center, different activities were organized to celebrate the commemorative date, a meeting of the first Cheyennes was held, an exhibition in the school gallery of photos that remembered the memory of the high school, including in Collective Transportation System put into circulation a commemorative ticket for the anniversary of CECyT 2.

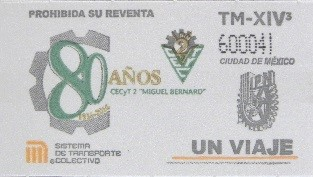
Mexico City Metro Commemorative Ticket

== Coat of arms ==
The current shield dates from the sixties, this insignia integrates different elements which are described below:

The gear: Represents engineering and mechanical industry.

The metallic column and rays: Represents the symbol of electrical engineering.

The terrestrial globe: Represents the reception area for aspiring students to the CECyT.

The number 2: It indicates the number assigned to the institution.

The letter V: Represents the vocational symbol.

The acronyms: CECyT indicate the acronym of the school.

== Programs ==
The CECYT 2 "Miguel Bernard Perales" offers 7 technical degrees in mathematics and physical sciences:

- Technician in Aeronautics
- Technician in Computer-Aided Drawing
- Technician in Digital Graphic Design
- Technician in Metallurgy
- Technician in Machines and Automated Systems
- Technician in Automotive Systems
- Technician in Mechatronics

== Academies ==
The school is organized in academies that direct the different disciplines that are implemented. Depending on the schedule.

- Academy of Mathematics Morning: Magdalena Téllez.
- Academy of Physics Morning: Victor Hugo Montañez Cruz.
- Academy of Basic Sciences Morning:
- Academy of Biology Morning: Dolores Camargo.
- Academy of Chemistry Morning: José Nelson Moheyer Negrete.
- English Academy Morning: Tania Silva Hernández.

- Academy of Mathematics Evening: Alfredo Rodriguez Gomez.
- Academy of Physics Evening: Chagoya.
- English Academy Evening: Fernando Castillo Mejia.
