= Atizapán de Zaragoza =

- Municipality
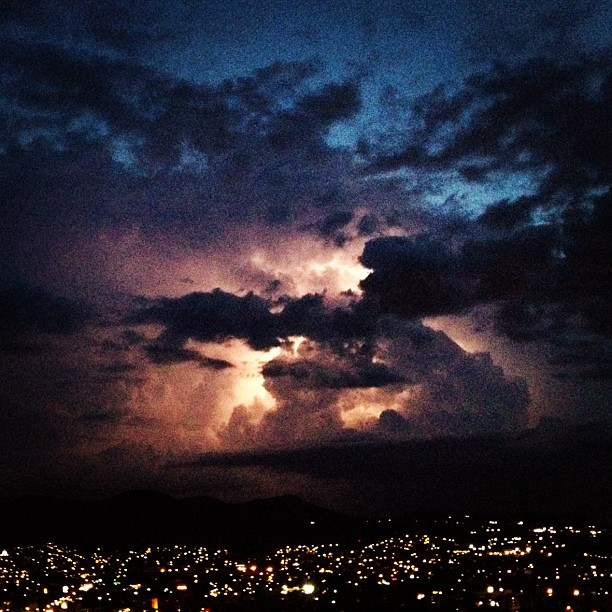
- Thunderstorm in Atizapán de Zaragoza

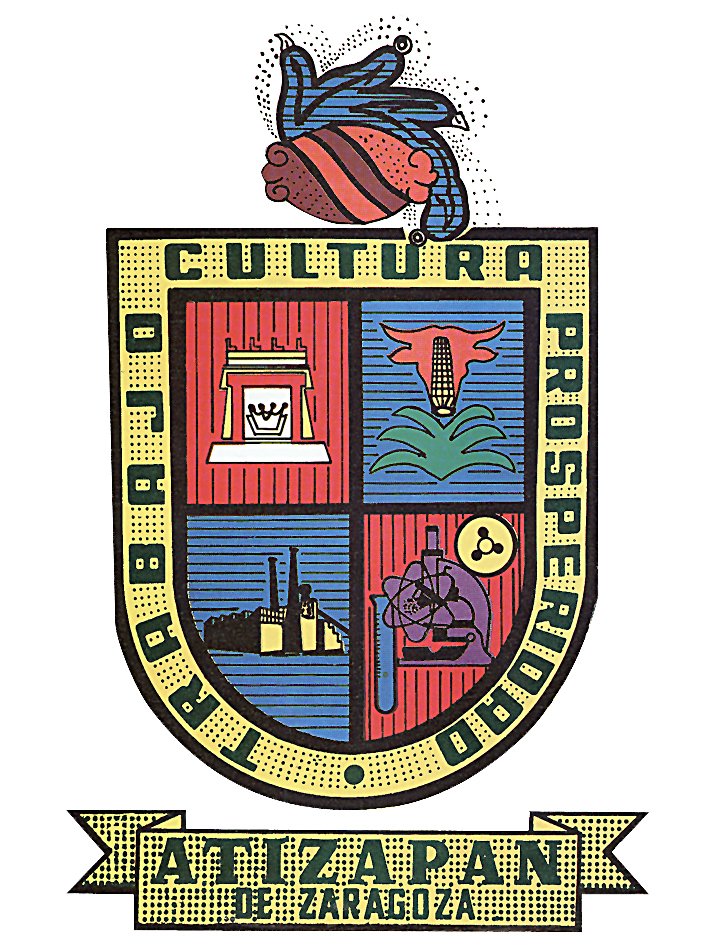
- Coat of arms

- Coordinates: 19°33′40″N 99°14′49″W
- Country: Mexico
- State: State of Mexico
- Region: Tlalnepantla
- Municipal seat: Ciudad López Mateos

Government
  - Municipal President: Ana María Balderas Trejo

Area
  - Total: 91.07 km^{2} (35.16 sq mi)
- Elevation (of seat): 2,286 m (7,500 ft)

Population (2020)
  - Total: 523,674
  - Density: 5,750/km^{2} (14,890/sq mi)
- Time zone: UTC-6 (Central Standard Time)

San Mateo road

Atizapán de Zaragoza is a municipality, in the State of Mexico, Mexico. The municipality covers an area of 91.07 km^{2}. In 2020, the municipality had a total population of 523,674. At the west side of the city is the Zona Esmeralda district (the Lomas de Valle Escondido and surrounding neighborhoods), considered one of the wealthiest in the State of Mexico and Greater Mexico City. The Valle Escondido and Chiluca country clubs are located here.

It takes its name from the nahuatl word Ātīzapan, which is formed by three words: "ā-tl", which means "water", "tīza-tl", which means "white clay" and "īpan, which means "over" or "place over" in a metaphorical form. Finished this, the name means "Place over clay waters". Atizapán is located east from Toluca, and inside the Greater Mexico City limits.

During the French intervention in Mexico, general Ignacio Zaragoza stayed in Atizapán and used the area to gather weapons, from which its namesake is derived.

== Geography ==
While the city takes up almost all of the municipality, Ciudad López Mateos has governing jurisdiction over: Campos los Cedros, El Pedregal, Presa las Ruinas, Presa San Juan, Valle de Paz, Viejo Madín and Rancho Blanco Ejido de Espíritu Santo, the only one with any significant population at 501 people.

The municipality has an area of 89.9 km^{2} (34.71 sq mi) and reported a population of 472,526. It lies in the northeastern part of the state, just northwest of the Federal District (Mexico City). This municipality is in the northwestern part of the state (in the metropolitan area of Mexico City). The municipality borders Naucalpan, Tlalnepantla de Baz, and Cuautitlán Izcalli.

In 1984, the city hall was transferred from downtown Atizapán, to a new building near the municipal limit with the municipality of Tlalnepantla de Baz.

From 1997 to 2009, Atizapán was under the government of the National Action Party.

Atizapán has several golf courses such as La Hacienda, Chiluca, Bellavista and Valle Escondido.

== History ==
In 2000, Antonio Domínguez Zambrano was elected as the President of Atizapán, representing the National Action Party. After taking possession of the government was discovered that he was the head of many corruption and fraud events and also bullying rivals and fraud.

But the main charge was the murder of fellow party partner María de los Ángeles Tamez Reyes, which at the time was working as part of his government.

As a result, Antonio Domínguez was found guilty on all accounts and sent to prison with his secretary Daniel García.

== Industry ==
In Atizapán de Zaragoza there are small yet significant industrial areas that house Mexican companies, with 80% of their employees living within the local government. Grupo Assa, dedicated to textile production, has been based in the town since 1978.

== Politics ==
Mayor	Period
Juan Antonio Domínguez Zambrano	2000-2003
Salvador Vázquez y Herrera	2003-2006
Gonzalo Alarcon Bardena	2006-2009
Jesus David Castañeda Degado	2009-2012
Pedro David Rodríguez Villegas	2012-2015
Ana María Balderas Trejo	2015-2018

Atizapán de Zaragoza municipality has a town hall. The administration is headed by a municipal president or mayor and includes a treasurer, a municipal secretary and councilors; the municipal seat is Ciudad López Mateos town. This municipality has a Municipal public announcement of police side and good governance (Bando municipal de policía y buen gobierno), are local laws, this is issued each year and published every February 5, the national Constitution Day.

== Demography ==
Town	Population
Total	489,937
Ciudad López Mateos	489,160
Condado de Sayavedra	2,574
