= San Ángel =

Coordinates: 19.347°N 99.187°W

- Colonia
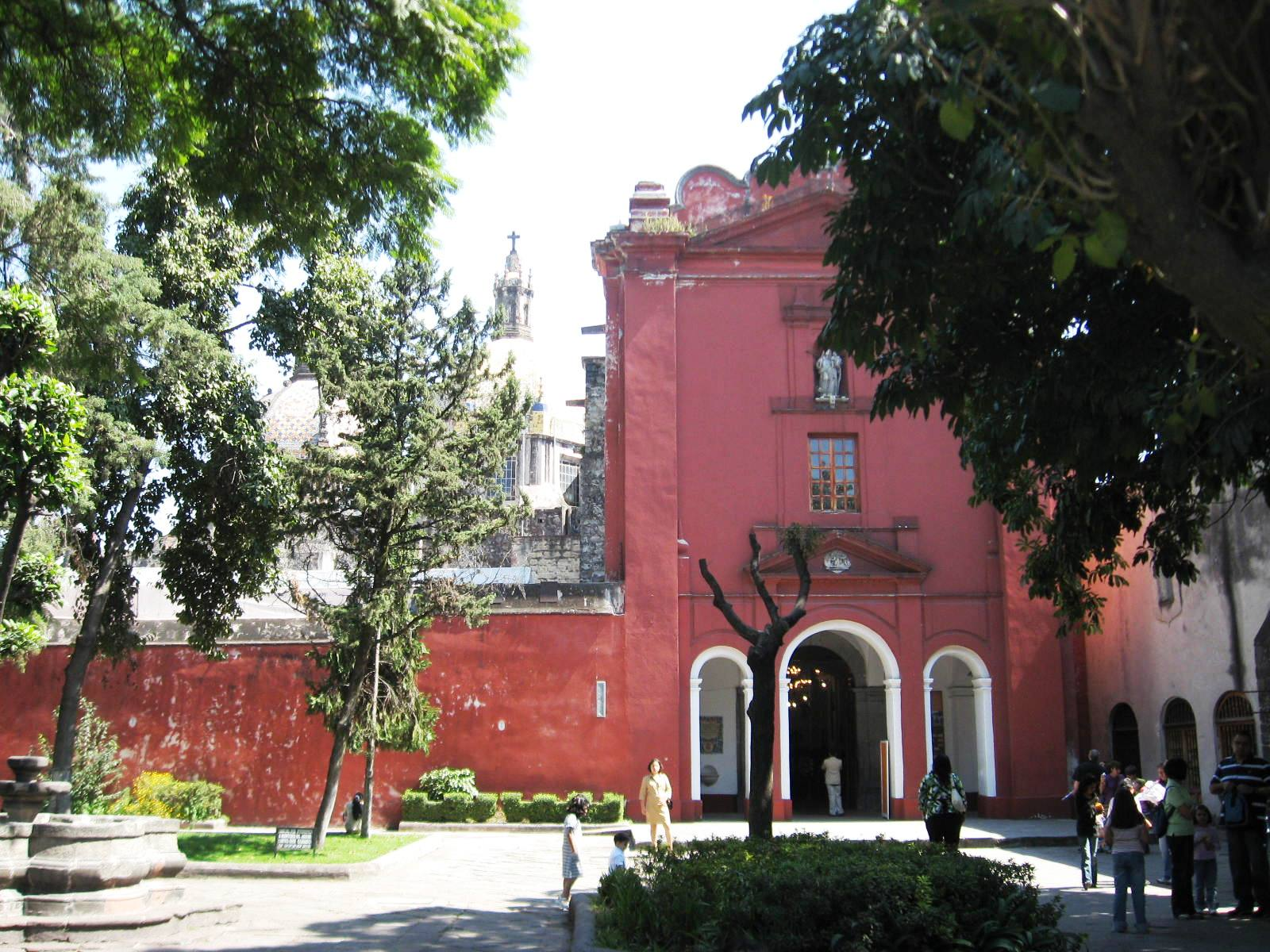
- Ex-convent of El Carmen
- Interactive map of San Ángel
- Country: Mexico
- Federal entity: Mexico City
- Borough: Álvaro Obregón

Area
  - Total: 0.49 km^{2} (0.19 sq mi)

Population (2003)
  - Total: 2,890
  - Density: 5,900/km^{2} (15,000/sq mi)
- Time zone: UTC-6 (Zona Centro)
- Postal code: 01000

San Ángel is a colonia (neighborhood) located in the southwest of Mexico City in Álvaro Obregón borough. Historically it was a rural community called Tenanitla in the pre-Hispanic period. Its current name is derived from the El Carmen monastery school called San Ángel Mártir. It remained a rural community centered on the monastery until the 19th and 20th centuries when the monastery closed and the area joined the urban sprawl of Mexico City. The area still contains many historic buildings, and El Carmen is one of the most visited museums in the city. Its annual flower fair, Feria de las Flores , has been held since 1856.

In 1934 San Ángel was declared a Pueblo Típico Pintoresco (Picturesque Typical Town); in 1987 it was declared a historical monument zone.

== Geography ==
San Ángel is located in the southwest of the Federal District of Mexico along the southern end of Avenida Insurgentes, bordering the Ciudad Universitaria of UNAM . For most of its history, the area was politically and physically separate from the urban sprawl of Mexico City, becoming integrated with the city in the mid-20th century.

The community is surrounded by a volcanic rock bed called the Pedregal, which was formed by the eruption of nearby Xitle Volcano about 2,000 years ago. Parts of this volcanic rock bed have been made into protected areas such as the Pedregal de San Ángel. This area is estimated to have a total of 350 native plant species, 100 species of birds, forty species of mammals and twenty of reptiles. The representative plant of the area is called the palo loco (crazy stick) because it blooms in the winter rather than the summer.

== El Carmen complex ==
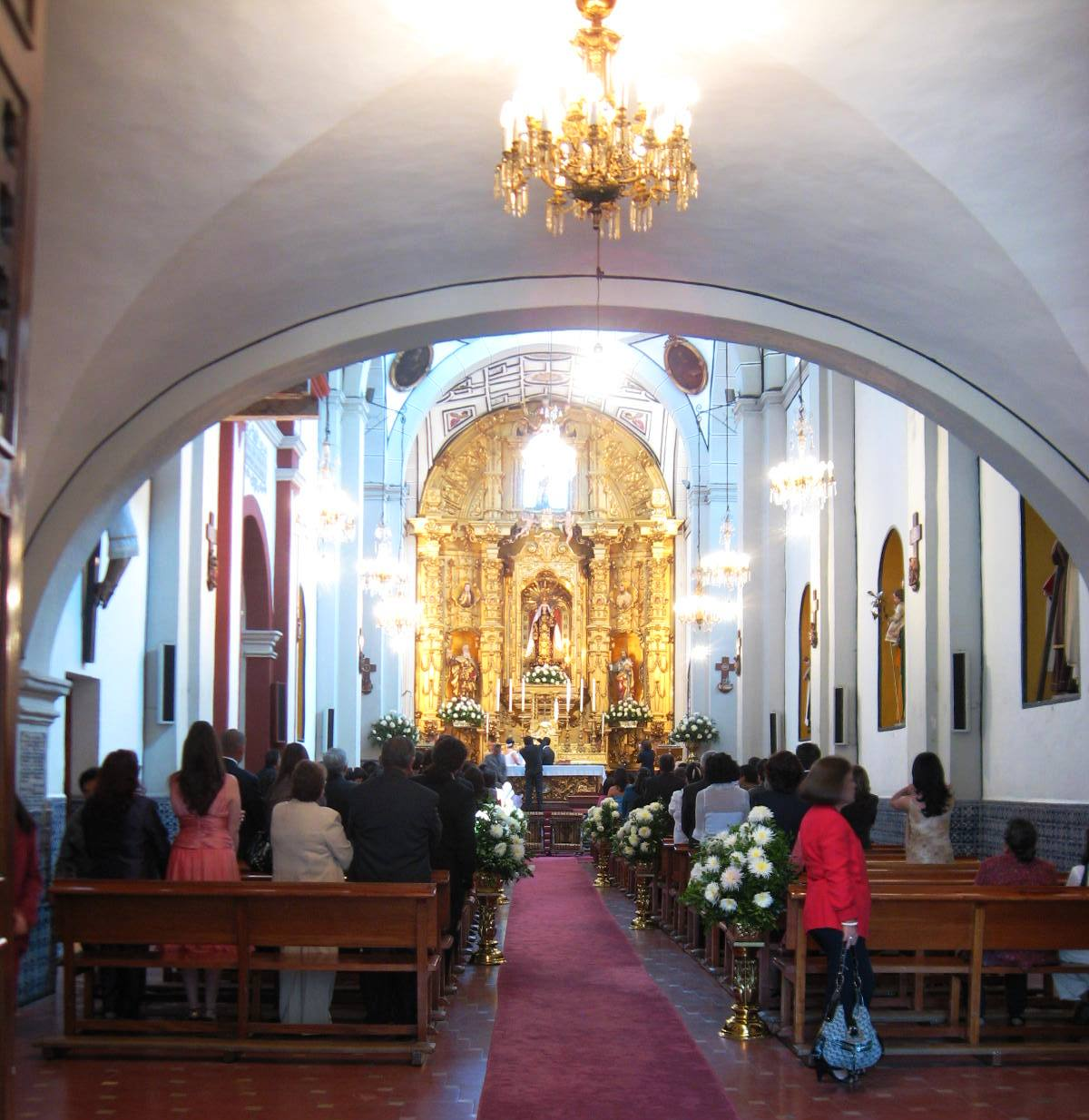
Inside the chapel of El Carmen

The El Carmen complex is the identifying marker of San Ángel, especially the three tiled-covered domes of the church. It consists of church, former monastery and school buildings. The monastery school or "Colegio" was founded in 1613, but the building for it would not begin until two years later. This building was designed by Fray Andrés de San Miguel with the first stone laid in 1615, and it was operational in 1617. The school changed its name to Señora de Santa Ana in 1634, but while it retained the official name, it never caught on popularly.

The church was built between 1624 and 1626 also dedicated to San Ángel Martír. The facade is Herrerian over which is its bell-gable, modeled after that of San José de Ávila in Spain. The structure is topped by three domes covered in glazed tile. The entire monastery complex was complete in 1628. It was surrounded by large tracts of gardens and orchards, much of which is now Colonia Chimalistac to the east. These orchards made the monastery wealthy and famous.

The monastery and school area came under the custody of the Instituto Nacional de Antropología e Historia in 1939 which still maintains it. The current museum was opened in 1955 and is one of the most visited in the city. The museum conserves a number of the monastery's original spaces, such as the dining room, and has one of the most important collections of colonial era art in Mexico, including a permanent exhibition called "The Silence of the Carmelites." This traces the history of the order from its origins through images, sculpture, documents, furniture and more.

One reason the museum is well-visited is the mummies on display in the basement crypt area. From the 17th to the 19th centuries, one way that the order raised funds for its existence was to set aside crypts for donors from the wealthy families of the area. While many of these bodies would be exhumed after a number of years, with their bones stored in an "osorio" later, some of the interred here did not completely decompose. Between 1917 and 1918, troops ransacked the convent, looking for treasure. What they found in the crypt area instead were a number of well-preserved, naturally occurring mummies. The museum has twelve mummies on display in the crypt area, however, many are in deteriorating condition because they are not in hermetically sealed cases.

== Other landmarks ==
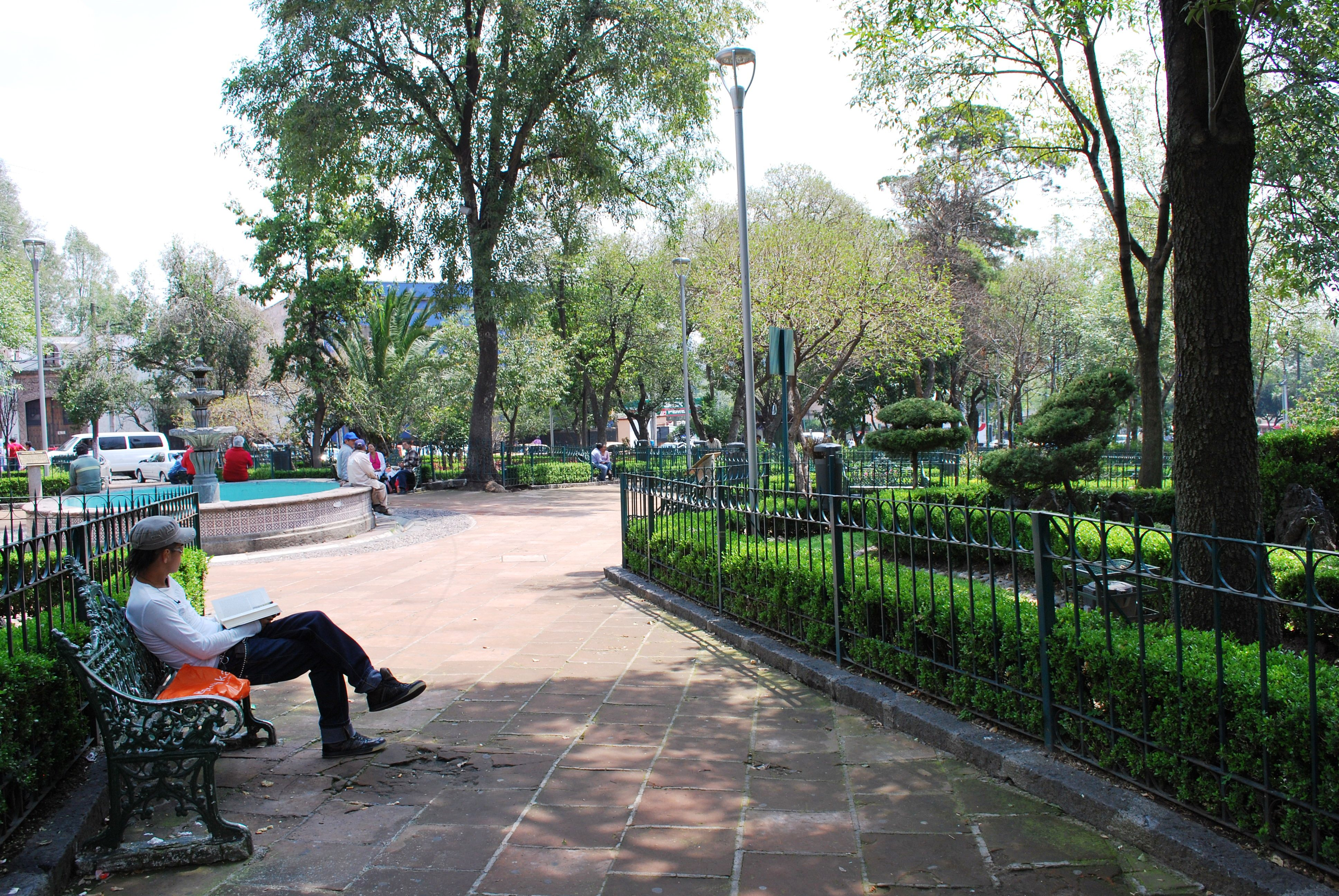
View at the Plaza del Carmen

Around the Plaza del Carmen, there are a number of historic buildings such as the old municipal palace, which has been converted into the Centro Cultural San Ángel. Near this are two former mansions which belonged to the Mariscal de Castilla. More of the area's mansions are found on La Amargura Street including one that belonged to the Fagoaga family. This structure dates from the 18th century and belonged to Francisco Fagoaga, who ran the colonial coin mint. It is said that it was also inhabited by Archbishop Alonso Núñez de Haro y Peralta. Another house on this street was the property of Porfirio Díaz. The Casa del Obispo Madrid, in contrast, is a simple adobe structure from 1631, which was the property of Bishop Fernández de Madrid. Later, it was inhabited by General Santa Anna and poet José Zorrilla.

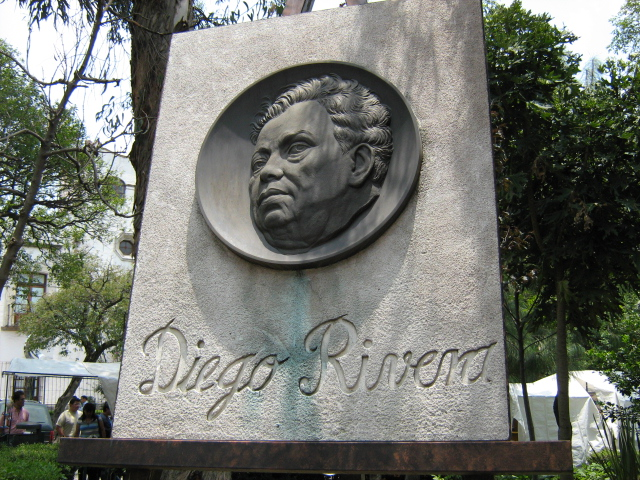
At Plaza de San Jacinto

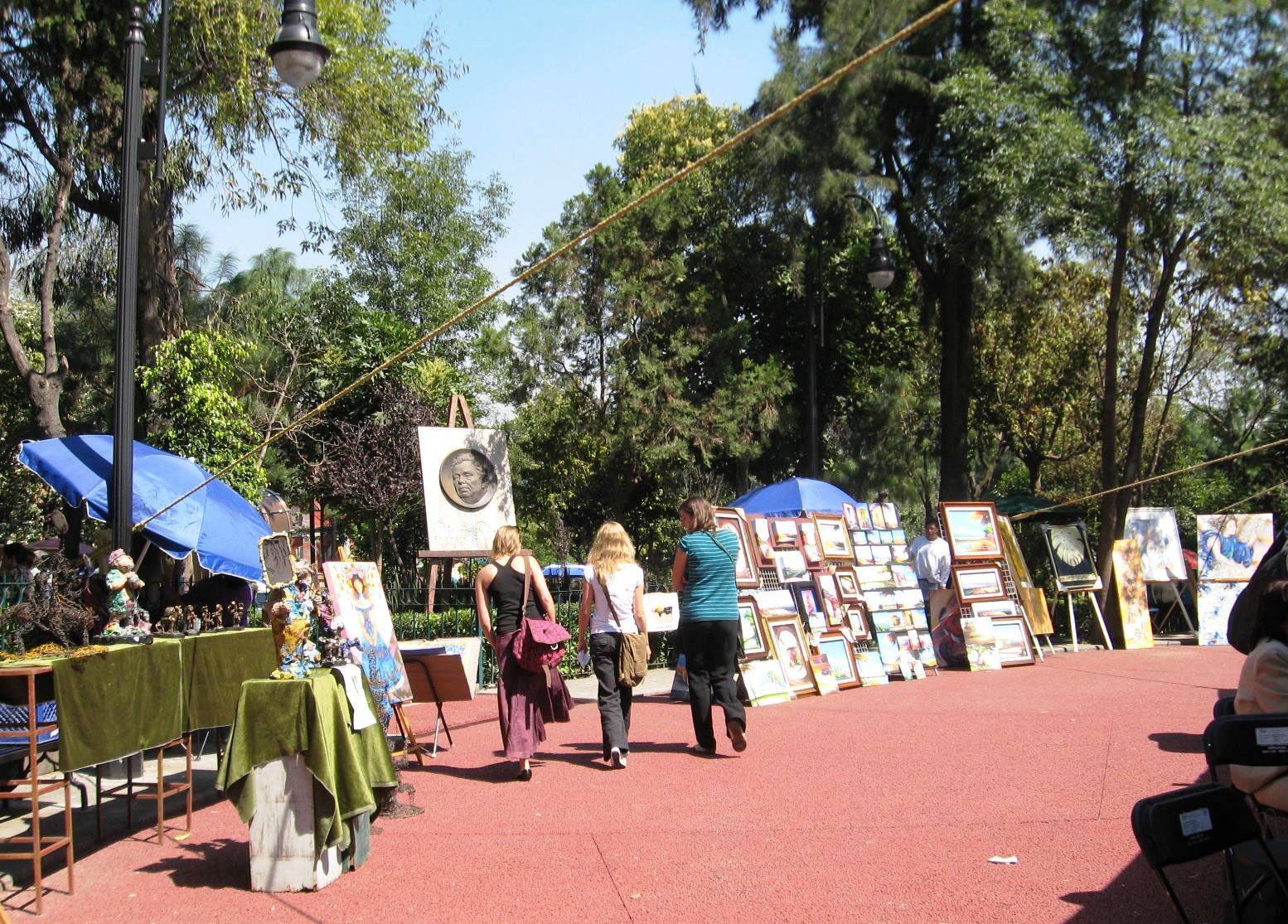
Saturday art market in Plaza San Jacinto

The Plaza de San Jacinto is the other main center of the area, best known for its Saturday art bazaar. It is also surrounded by former mansions, most of which have been converted into art galleries and restaurants. The most famous of these is Casa del Risco from the 17th century. Its interior contains a highly ornate Baroque fountain covered in plates, platters, cups and other ceramic pieces from Asia, Europe and Mexico. On the west side of the plaza is the Church of San Jacinto. The Dominicans founded this church in 1596 dedicated to Saint Hyacinth. Its main altar is wood covered in gold. The former monastery is austere and served as such until 1754.

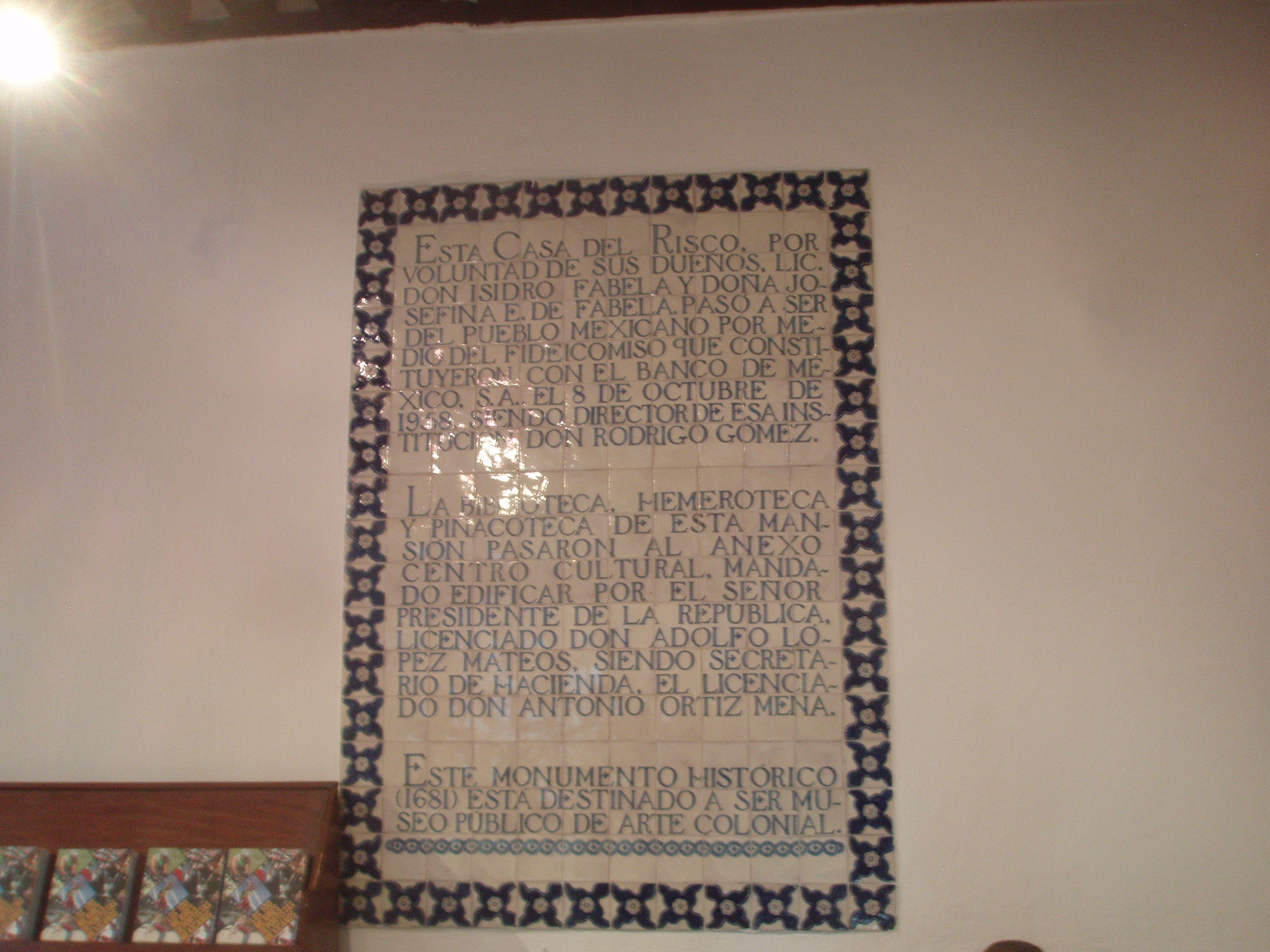
Casa del Risco, currently home to Centro Cultural Isidro Fabela

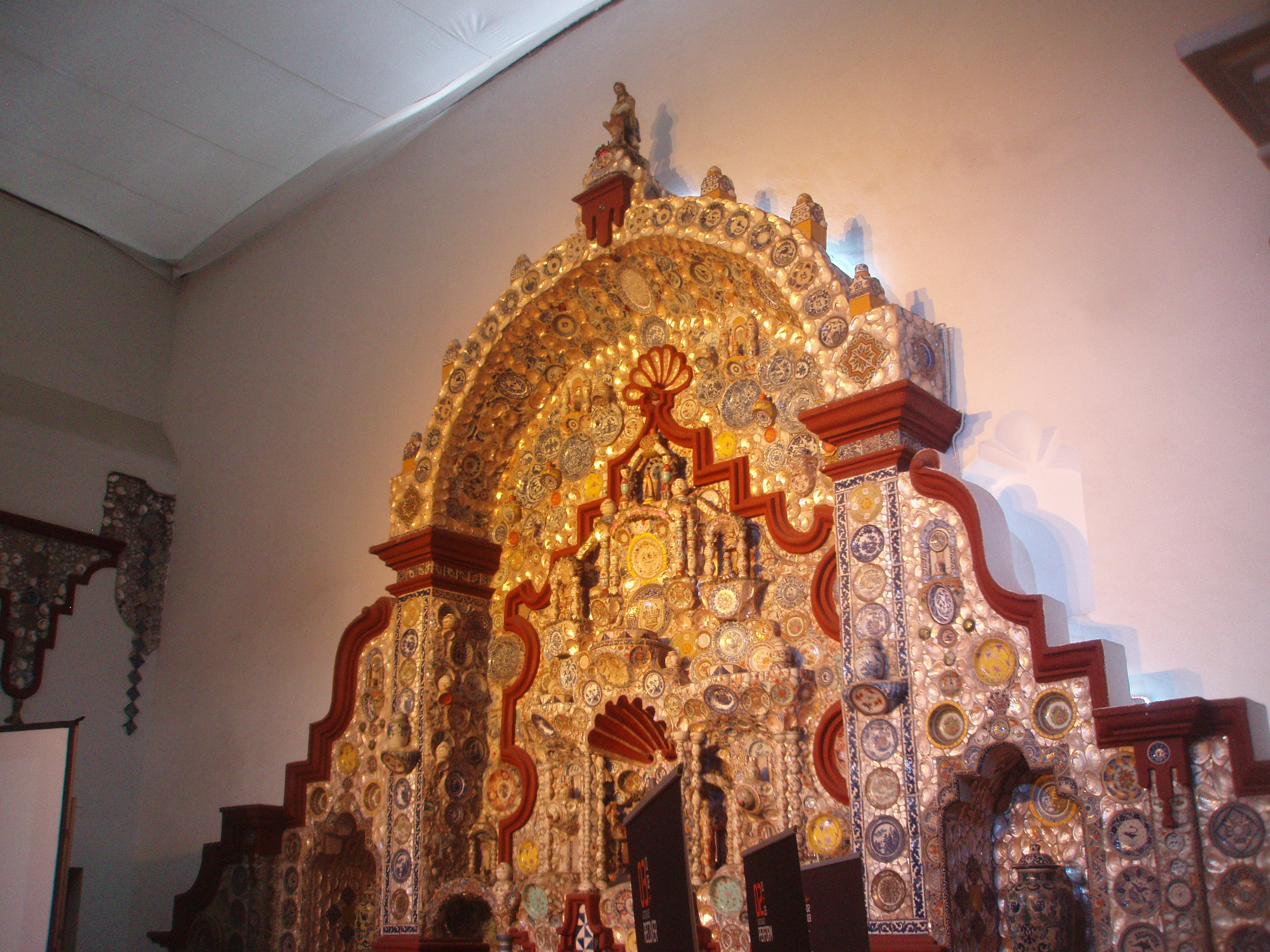
Baroque fountain within Casa del Risco

The Plazuela de los Licenciados is on Calle de Juárez with three notable residences. One is in European style, another is from the 18th century and the last was the former Hospital Real de Naturales. A short distance from this plaza is another structure called the Casa Blanca which is possibly the oldest in San Ángel, built in the middle of the 17th century by the Counts of Oploca. Its orchards were second only to those of El Carmen.

The Plaza de Arcangeles is small and not well known but it is distinct in its abundance of trees and other vegetation. Its name comes from three large sandstone benches with the name of the Archangels Gabriel, Michael and Rafael on them.

The Museo Casa Estudio Diego Rivera y Frida Kahlo is on Altavista and Diego Rivera Streets. These were dual houses, one for each painter, connected which served as homes and work spaces for the pair. The structure was built by Juan O'Gorman as one of the first Functionalist structures in Mexico City. The museum has a notable collection of Judas figures made of paper and cardboard and burnt on Holy Saturday.

The Museo de Arte Carrillo Gil is on Camino al Desierto de los Leones, which has one of the country's best contemporary art collections. It also is a research and support center for artists.

The Pedregal de San Ángel Ecological Reserve is located in the southwest of Mexico City in the Ciudad Universitaria. It is one of the few undisturbed natural ecosystems in the Valley of Mexico. It is distinguished as being over a relatively solid bed of volcanic rock, from an eruption of the nearby volcano Xitle and has a number of unique plant and animal species.

== History ==
The San Ángel area was originally called Tenanitla, which means "walled in place" in Nahuatl language. This referred to the solidified volcanic flow that surrounds the center of San Ángel, which came from the nearby Xitle Volcano about 2,000 years ago.

The modern community has its roots in the establishment of two monastery complexes called San Jacinto and El Carmen in the 16th century, but the real center would be El Carmen. The Spanish town here was originally established with the name of San Jacinto Tenanitla. El Carmen was begun in 1597 when in the indigenous leader of Coyoacán, Felipe de Guzmán Itzolinque, along with Andrés de Mondragón and Elvira Gutierrez, donated lands to the Carmelites in the Tenanitla and Chimalistac areas. The monks used the land to establish their monastery and a school for monks, with the school, named San Ángel, inaugurated in 1613. The monastery and school became wealthy and powerful, mostly due to the productively of the lands, especially the orchards which had, at one time, over 13,000 trees. This prompted the community to rename itself San Ángel.

The monastery complex remained important through the colonial period, but a series of misfortunes would lead to its closure by the end of the 19th century. Shortly after Independence, the complex lost many of its monks, who were Spanish born. It was the site of a struggle called the Guerra de las Patentes (War of the Patents) over the payment of rental fees for farmland belonging to the monastery, which the monastery lost. During the Mexican–American War, U.S. troops sacked and destroyed some of its buildings and orchards and in 1856, the institution had to begin to partition and sell some of its lands. The monastery was closed as such during the Reform War, with only the church portion remaining completely intact.

The school portion, called the Colegio, was disputed between the municipal governments of Mexico City and San Ángel, which were separate at that time. The dispute was settled in San Ángel's favor in 1874 by Manuel Payno. However, parts of the school would be destroyed in 1891 to make way for the railroad connecting Mexico City to Tizapán. What remained became the property of the Secretaría de Educación Pública in 1921. In 1939, it would come under the custody of INAH and in the 1950s, it was converted into a museum.

The rest of San Ángel remained a rural farm community. The first change came in the second half of the 18th century, when wealthy families, such as that of the First Count of Revillagigedo, began to build country homes here. Through the 19th century, the area remained rural and popular for visitors. San Ángel from this time period was described by traveler Marquesa Calderón de la Barca in her book Life in Mexico.

At the end of the 19th century, a number of factories were set up here such as Loreto, La Alpina and La Hormiga, which raised the area's population. This was the beginning of the urbanization of San Ángel, although it would remain physically separate from the rest of urbanized Mexico City until the mid-20th century. Much of the area was not considered suitable for mass development until the 1950s, when the Ciudad Universitaria was constructed. The two growing areas would eventually join, completed with the construction of Avenida Insurgentes which divided the former gardens of El Carmen from those of Chimalistac. The construction of Avenida Revolución would then divide San Ángel into two parts.

The Pedregal de San Ángel was declared an ecological reserve in 1983.

Since the 20th century, development pressures have increased, with many residential buildings being converted into commercial areas. To work to preserve the area's rural layout and historic buildings, San Ángel was made the city's first Patrimonial Cultural Tangible de la Ciudad de México (Tangible Cultural Heritage of Mexico City) in 2008. It was also designated as a "Barrio Mágico" by the city in 2011.

== Architectural Heritage ==
The architectonic value of this zone is incalculable. Little by little, this value is being lost to modernity, but in general most of the buildings and spaces that represent various architectural styles such as baroque, neoclassical, and neocolonial have been preserved.

The main features of this zone are its monuments, plazas, narrow stone-paved streets, single or two floored houses made of brick or painted with vivid colors, balconies facing the avenues with vines and decorated front doors.

In this neighborhood, you can find various casonas; large houses that usually once belonged to someone important and now presume various architectural styles.

Casa del Mayorazgo Fagoaga

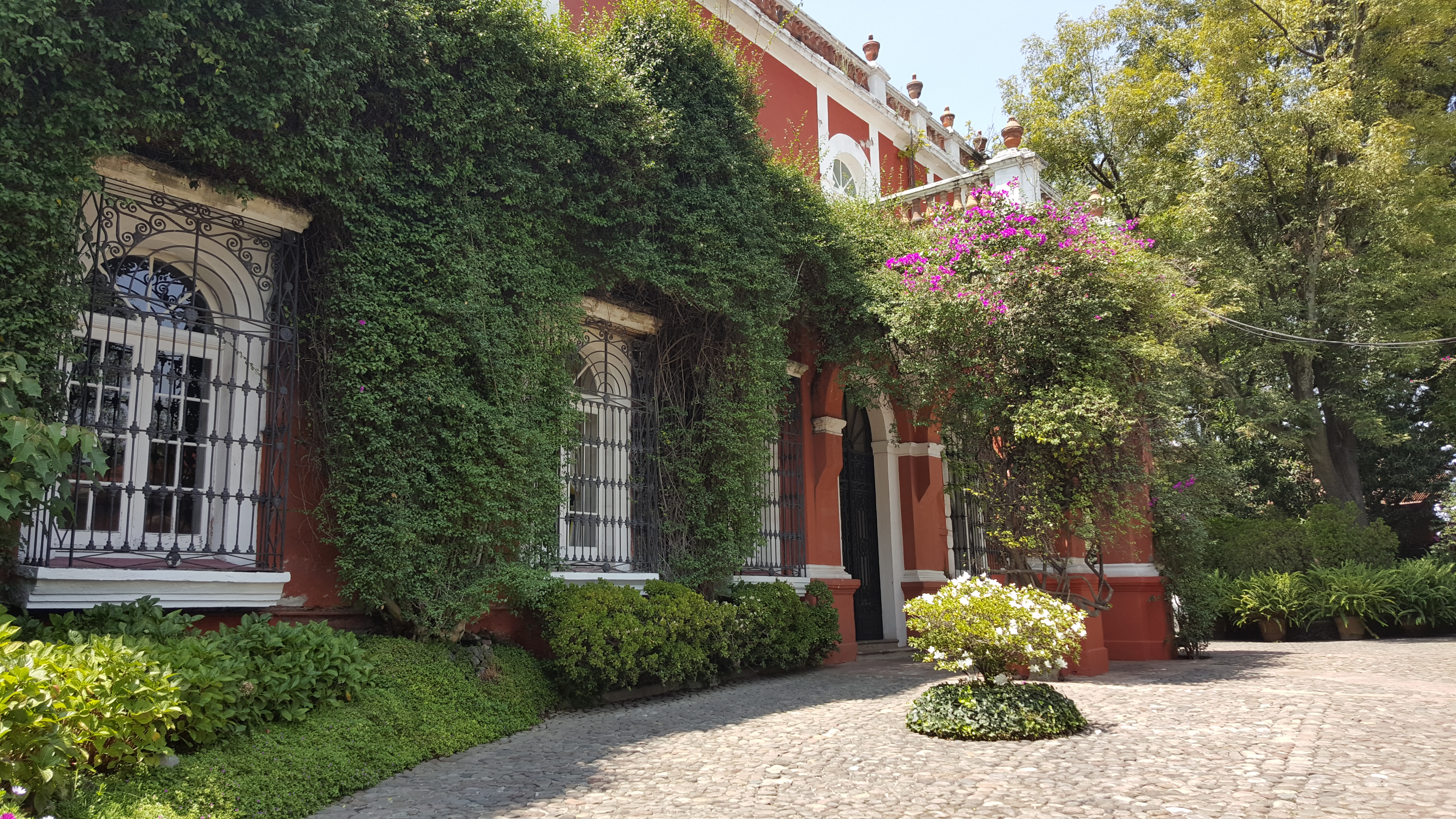
Mayorazgo de Fagoaga residence

This casona from the 17th century was named after a knight of the Santiago order, Don Francisco de Fagoga who was the owner of the house.

He was a rich silver and gold merchant from the New Spain colonial era, who separated the gold in Mexico City's coin house in 1735.

The house was made with balconies in a Baroque style and it is made as a typical European house from the 19th century with a Neoclassic style.

According to legend, when the Padiema Battle was happening, General Santa Anna was bowling at this property instead of fighting for the country.

Centro Cultural San Ángel

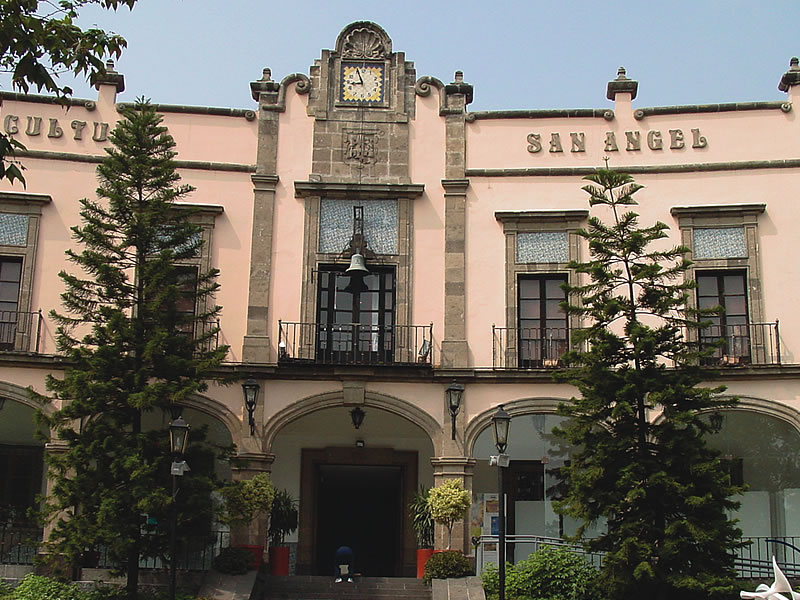
Centro Cultural San Ángel

The original structure of this cultural center was part of the Colegio Del Carmen. Halfway through the 19th century, the Colegio Del Carmen was demolished almost in its totality to edify San Ángel's Municipal Palace, finished in 1887. A century later, June 23, 1987, the edification was finally destined to be the Centro Cultural San Ángel, having its opening ceremony January 29, 1988. It now holds various temporal expositions and houses the Teatro López Tarso.

Casa de los Dos Patios

This casona was built at the end of the 19th century by philanthropist Francisco de Urquiaga. It features a neoclassical style, popular during the Porfiriato. Its name refers to the two patios the house possesses, the main one with a garden and rooms surrounding it and a secondary one used to keep carriages and horses. Legend tells that it served as a lair for the popular bandit Chucho el Roto, reason why the house is also referred to by his name. The house was restored and now houses the Biblioteca de las Revoluciones de México.

Casa Blanca

This casona belonged to the Oploca counts and resembles the countryside houses from the 17th century. Its facade portrays a now blurry coat of arms. It had the second biggest orchard of San Ángel, after the one in the Convento Del Carmen. It housed invasive troops during the Mexican–American War in 1847. It also housed foreign troops during the Second French intervention in Mexico. Halfway through the 19th century, it was inhabited by judge José del Villar Bocanegra, who rearranged it to serve as barracks for a detachment of emperor Maximilian I of Mexico. Later on, it belonged to a nun congregation. The residence was then bought and sold a number of times before being acquired by Mr. William Lucien Morkil in 1902.

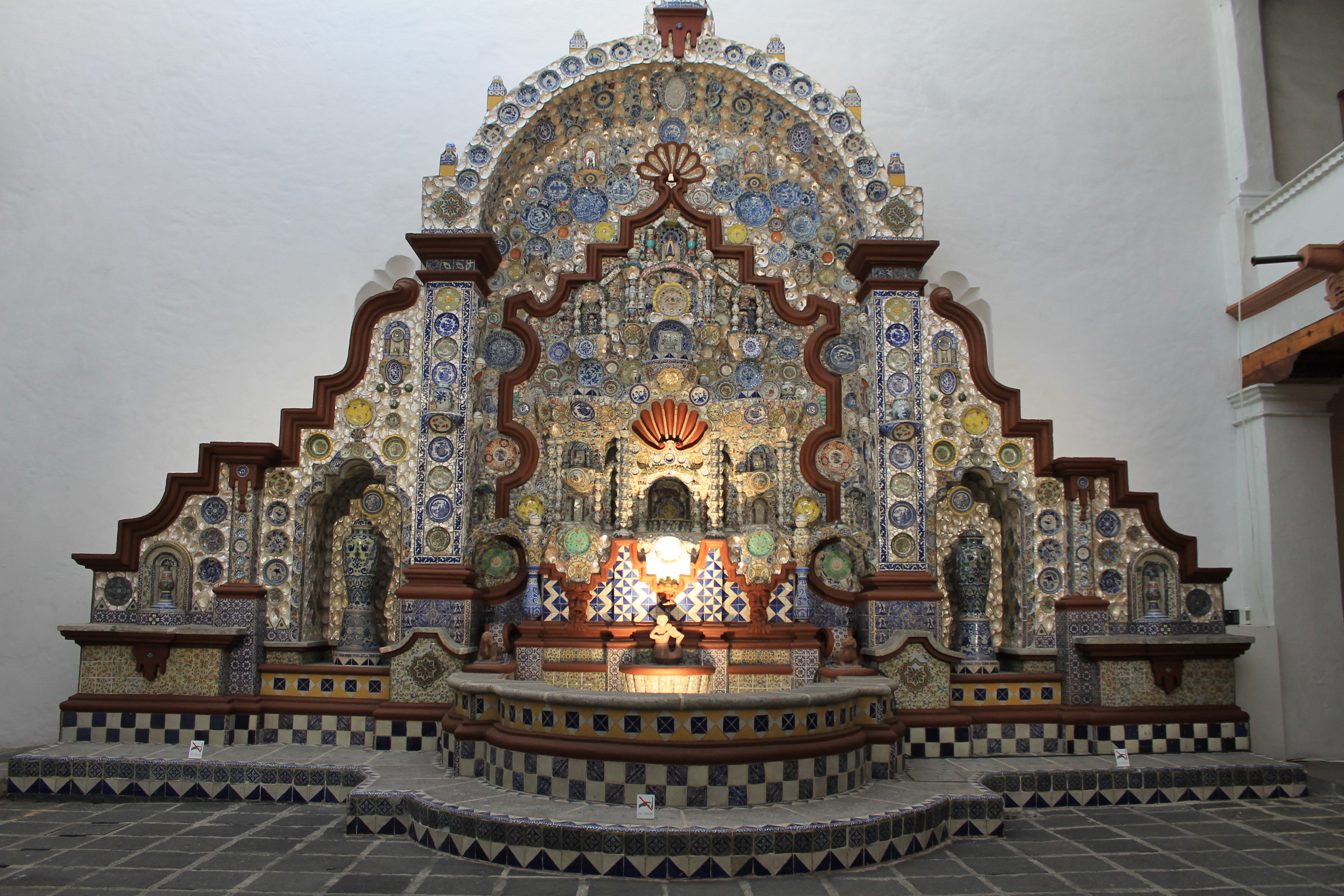
Baroque fountain at Casa del Risco

Casa del Risco

This construction of the 17th century was the residence of various characters of Mexican history. During the regime of General Antonio López de Santa Anna the house was used as barracks during the Mexican–American War. Later on it became a hospital that served the Saint Patrick's Battalion, composed mainly by Irish soldiers who defended the Mexican people from invasive troops. In 1933, the Casa del Risco was acquired by Isidro Fabela who donated it to the Mexican people along with his art collection in 1963. The collection consists of more than 1,500,000 documents and around 1,500 photographs, most of them related to the Mexican Revolution. Thanks to that, it now hosts the Centro Cultural Isidro Fabela. Apart from the Historical Archive and some galleries, it has an auditorium where cultural and academic activities are held. The mayor attraction of the museum is a Baroque fountain made of tile, porcelain, seashells and Chinese crockery featuring figures of mermaids and fish.

== Feria de las Flores ==
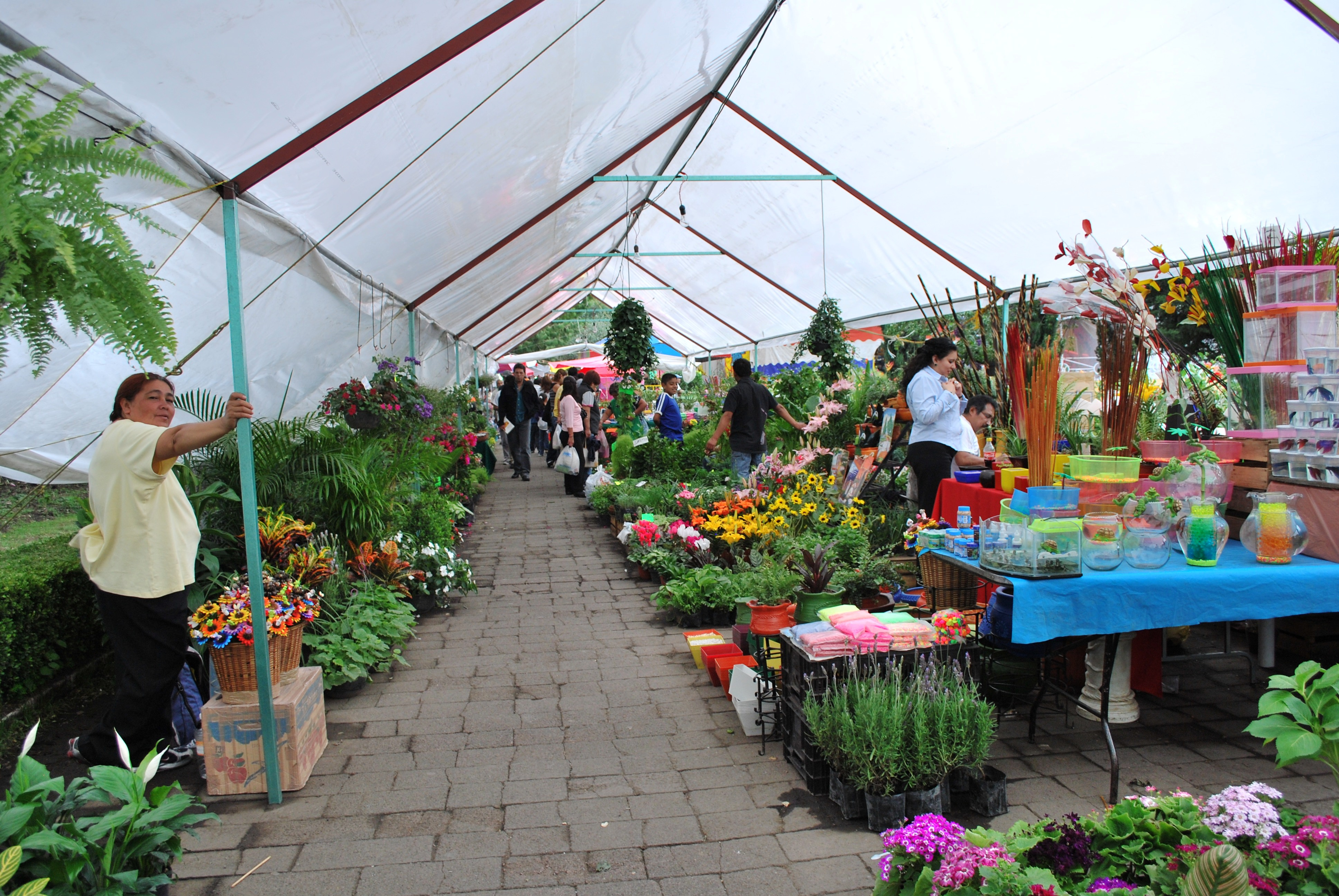
Plants for sale at the Feria de las Flores

The main annual event in San Ángel is the Feria de las Flores (Flower Fair) in July. This event has its origins in the pre-Hispanic period as an event dedicated to Xiuhtecuitl, a god of flowers. The purpose of the original event was to seek the god's protection for the area's floral and fruit crops. When the Carmelites come to the area, they adapted the ritual to Our Lady of Mount Carmen, making her the patroness of the area. This resulted in a festival with both indigenous and Catholic elements. The modern version of the festival began in the late 19th century. Although the religious event continued through the colonial period, its popularity had waned. In 1885, an effort was made to rescue the tradition, having two events, one dedicated to the Our Lady of Mount Carmen and the other to Xiuhtecuitl. These were fused in 1940 by borough authorities with the name la Feria de las Flores de San Ángel. Since then, the event has become more secular. It begin with a parade of floats starting at the Parque de la Bombilla, and includes activities such as painting exhibitions and contests, concerts, dance and theater recitals, charreada and food tasting.

== Economy ==
San Ángel is home to many upscale restaurants (particularly along Avenida de la Paz); boutique shopping center Plaza Grand San Ángel and the more commercial Plaza Loreto serve the affluent living in the southwest of the city. San Ángel itself hosts no large malls with department or big box stores. The Mercado del Carmen contains a food hall and design shops. The neighborhood also hosts a concentration of upscale interior design and furniture showrooms along Altavista street, and near the central plaza a concentration of some of the more exclusive shops selling curated selections of Mexican folk art.

== Public transportation ==
San Ángel is served by Line 1 (Insurgentes line) of the Mexico City Metrobús bus rapid transit system, by COREV (Corridor Revolución) buses, while the Miguel Ángel de Quevedo station on Line 3 of the Mexico City metro (subway) is about 1 kilometer east of the neighborhood.
