= Bell-gable =

Architectural element

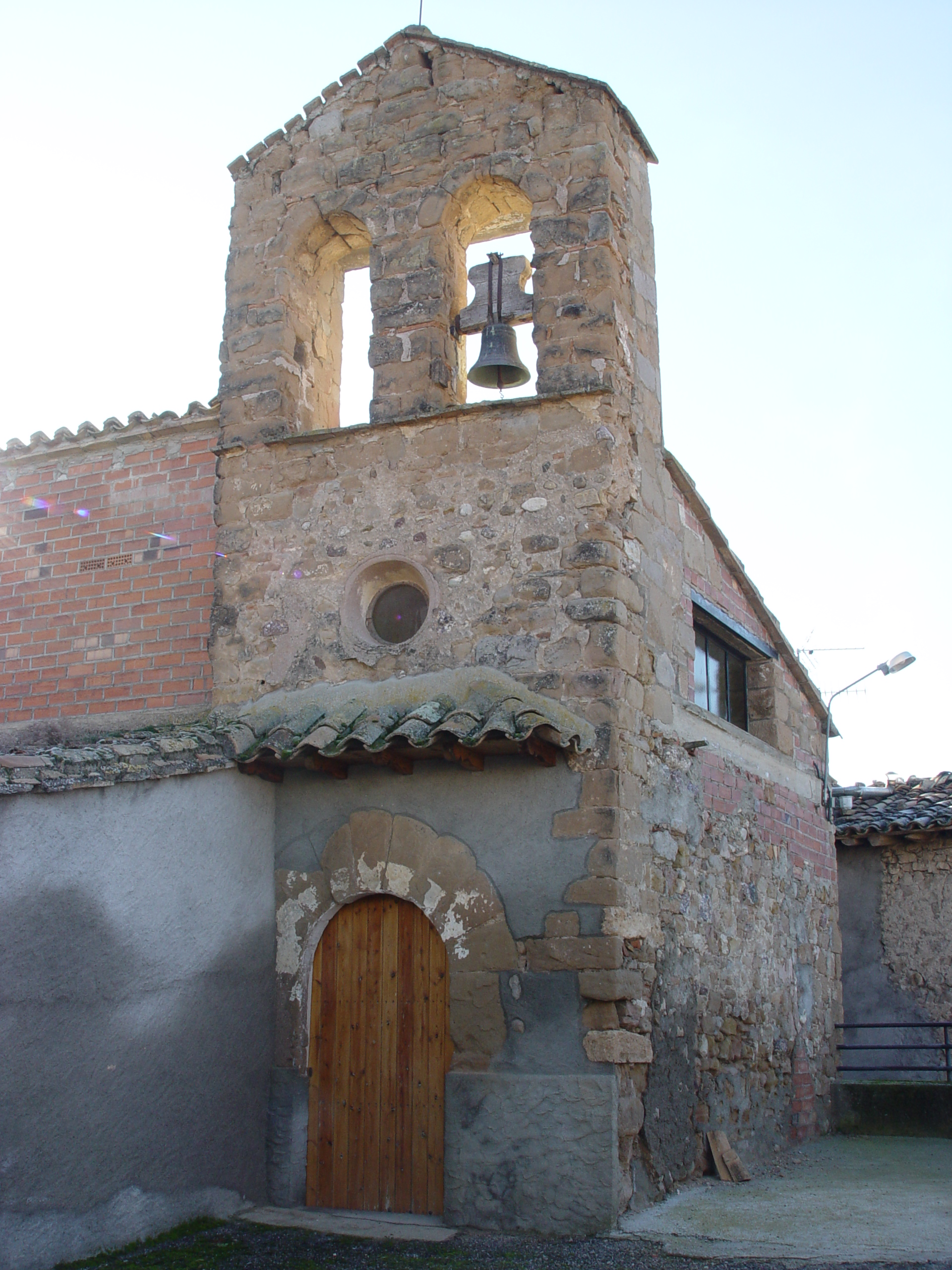
Simple bell gable at the St. James' Church of Entença (Spain), near the Pyrenees.

The bell gable (Spanish: espadaña, French: clocher-mur, Italian: campanile a vela) is an architectural element crowning the upper end of the wall of church buildings, usually in lieu of a church tower. It consists of a gable end in stone, with small hollow semi-circular arches where the church bells are placed. It is a characteristic example of the simplicity of Romanesque architecture.

== Overview ==
The bell-gables or espadañas are a feature of Romanesque architecture in Spain. They replaced the bell tower beginning the 12th century due to the Cistercian reformation that called for a more simplified and less ostentatious churches, but also for economical and practical reasons as the Reconquista accelerated and wider territory needed to be re-christianized building more temples and espadañas were cheaper and simpler to build. Today, they are a common sighting in small village churches throughout Spain and Portugal. This simple and sober architectural element would later be brought to the Americas and the Philippines by the Iberian colonizers, where it would find widespread use especially in the earliest structures.

The bell gable usually rises over the front façade wall, but in some churches it may be located on top of any other wall or even on top of the toral arch in the midst of the roof. In the Spanish regions of Catalonia and the Valencian Community, the bell-gables are also known as campanar de paret (wall bell tower) or campanar de cadireta. (little-chair bell tower) because it reminds one of the back of a chair.

In Écija, Spain, the bell tower of the church of Santa Bárbara fell destroyed by a lightning strike in 1892 and was replaced by an espadaña, a more expedient solution than rebuilding the tower.

A bell-cot is a similar structure, but may appear in places other than gables or building ends.

== Main types and styles ==
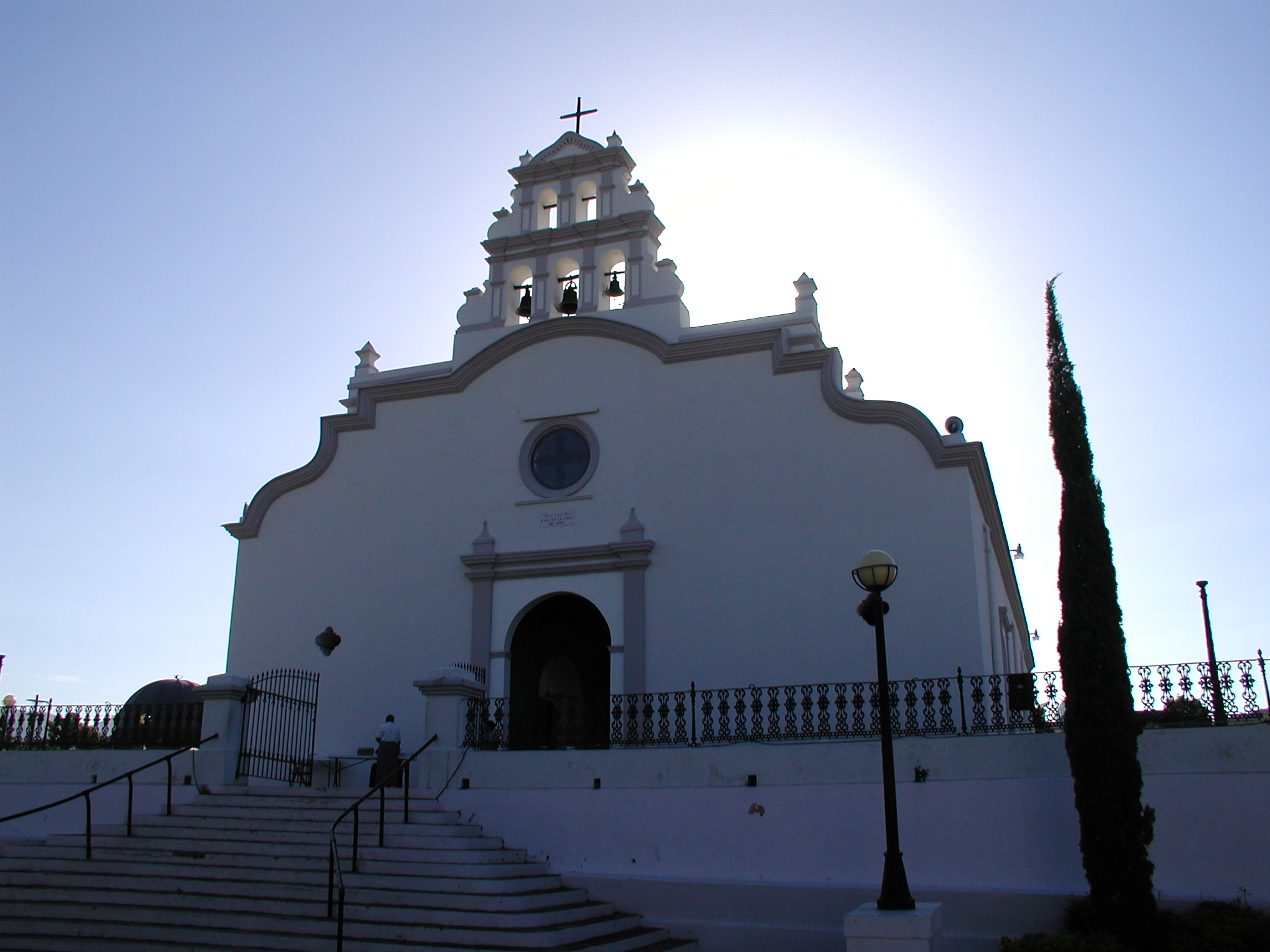
Bell gable at San Blas de Illescas Church, Puerto Rico

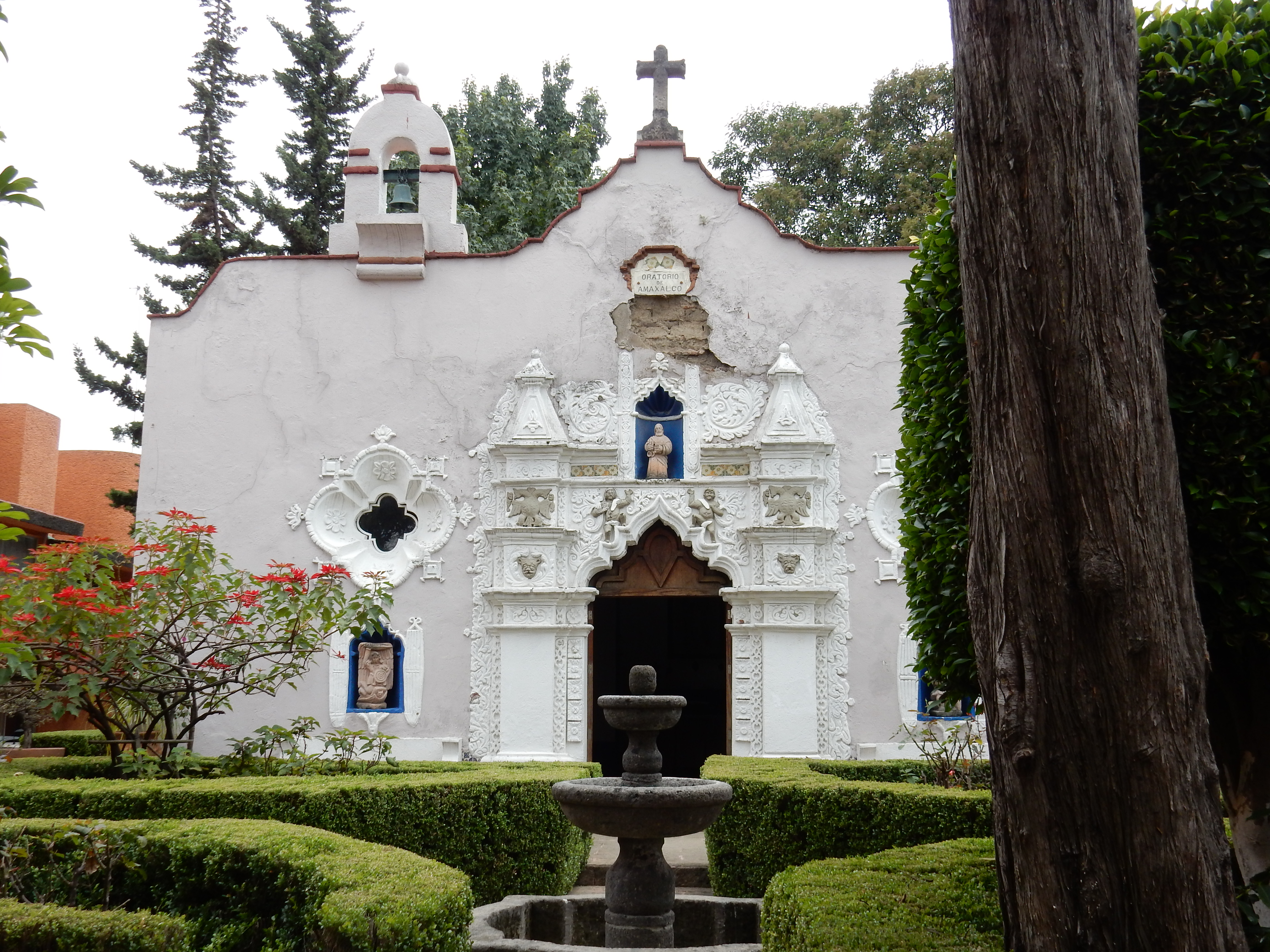
Single-eyed bell gable of the Amaxalco oratory, in Tlalpan, Mexico.

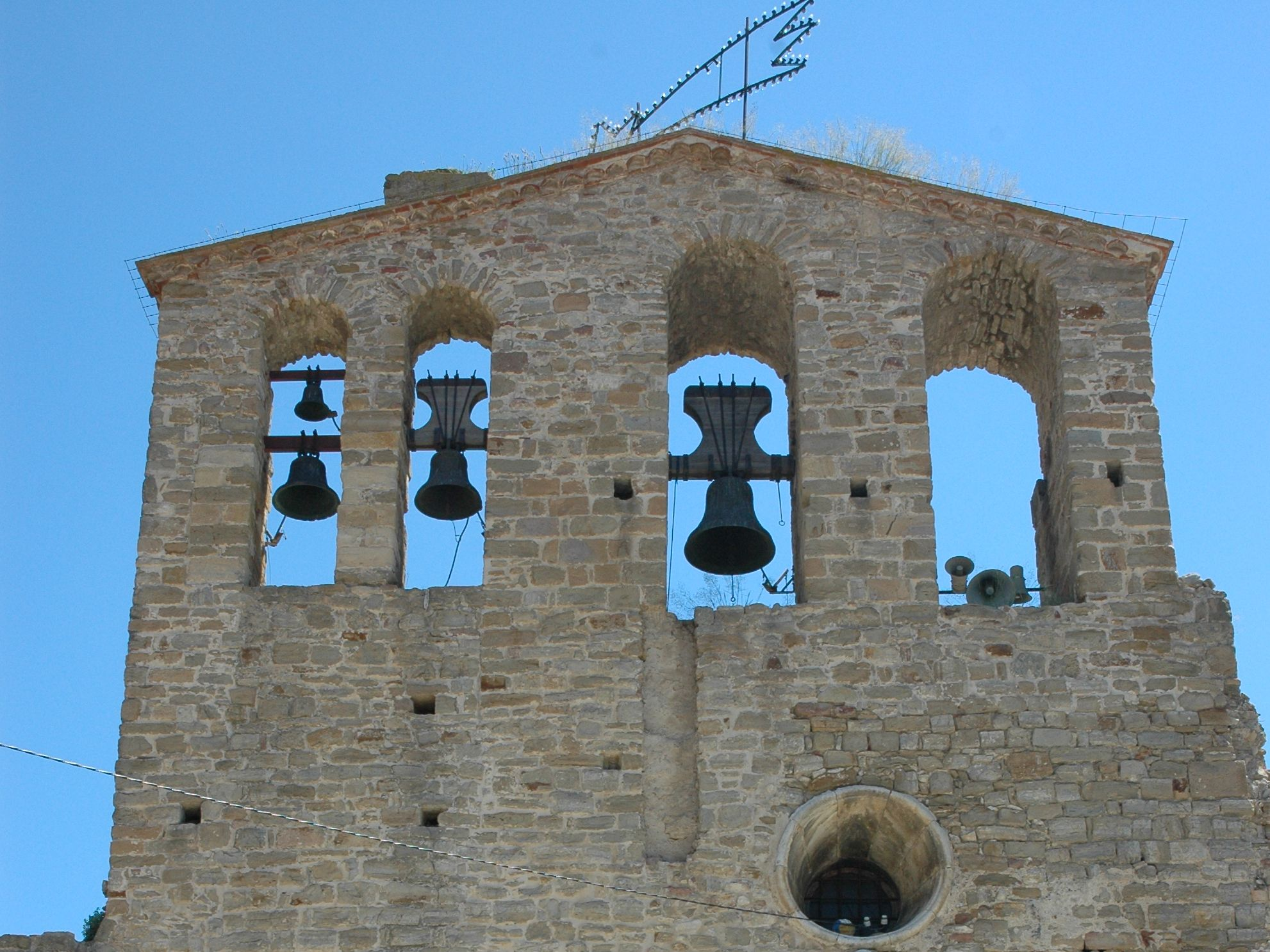
Four-eyed bell gable at Sant Pere d'Ullastret church, Spain.

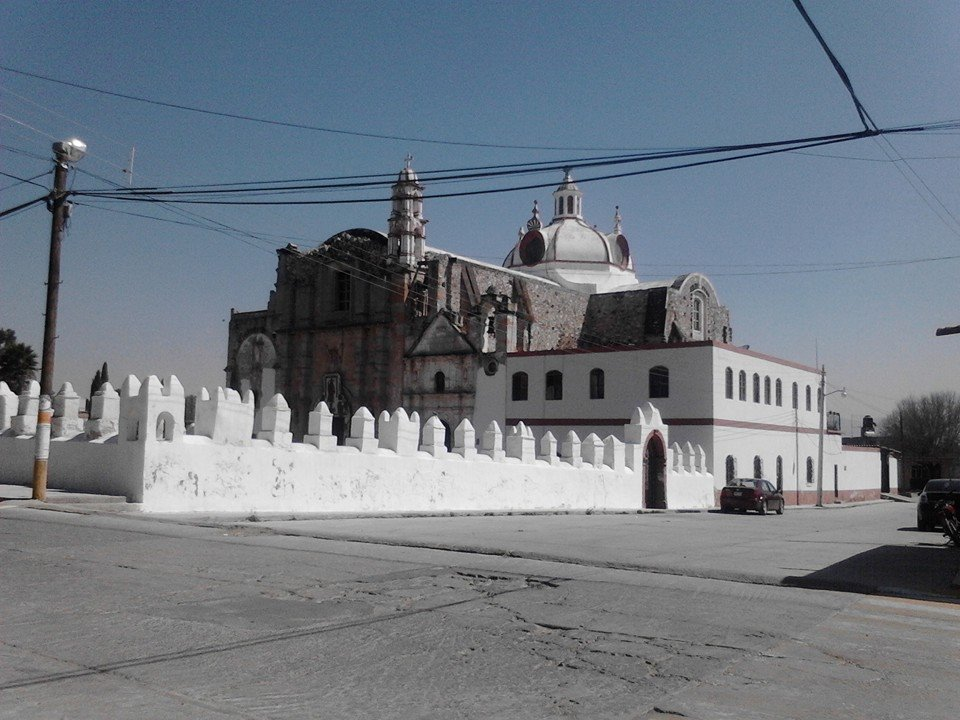
Church at San Salvador, Hidalgo, Mexico. Notice the small bell-gable in the top of the smaller chapel.

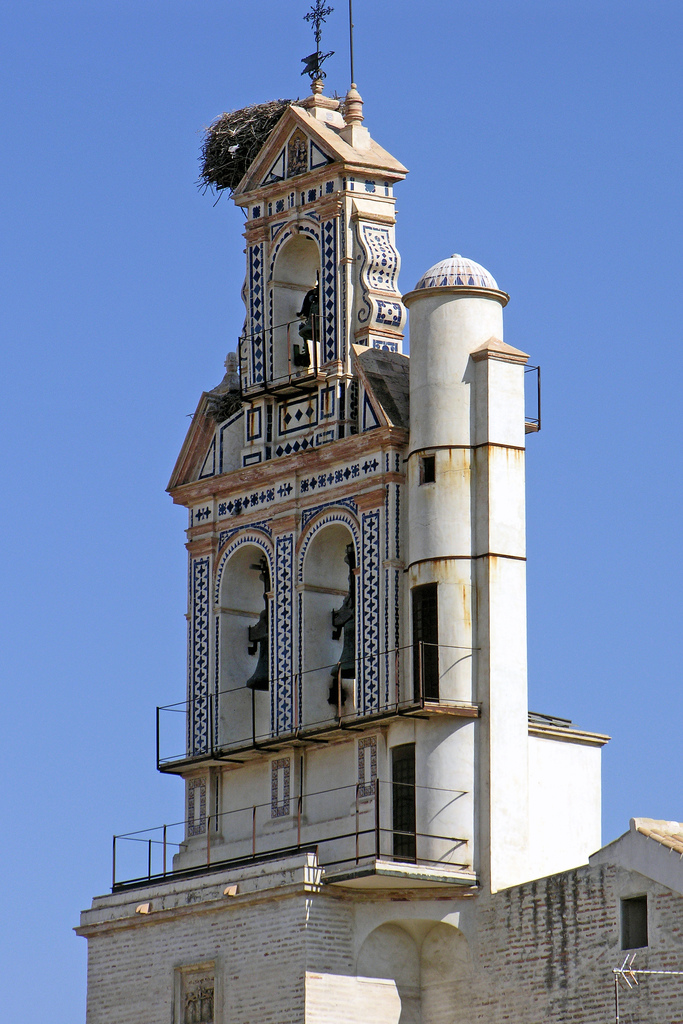
Espadaña at the Church of San Francisco, Écija, Spain.

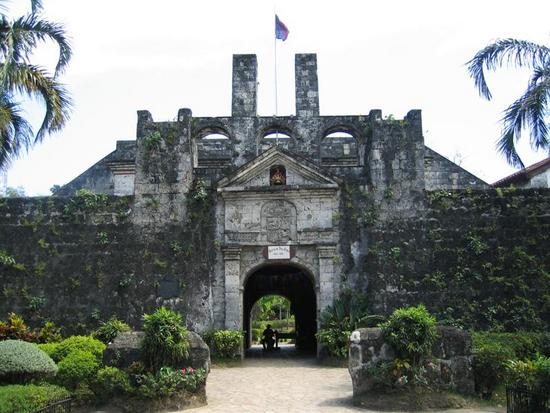
Unoccupied bell-gable at Fort San Pedro, in Cebú, Philippines.

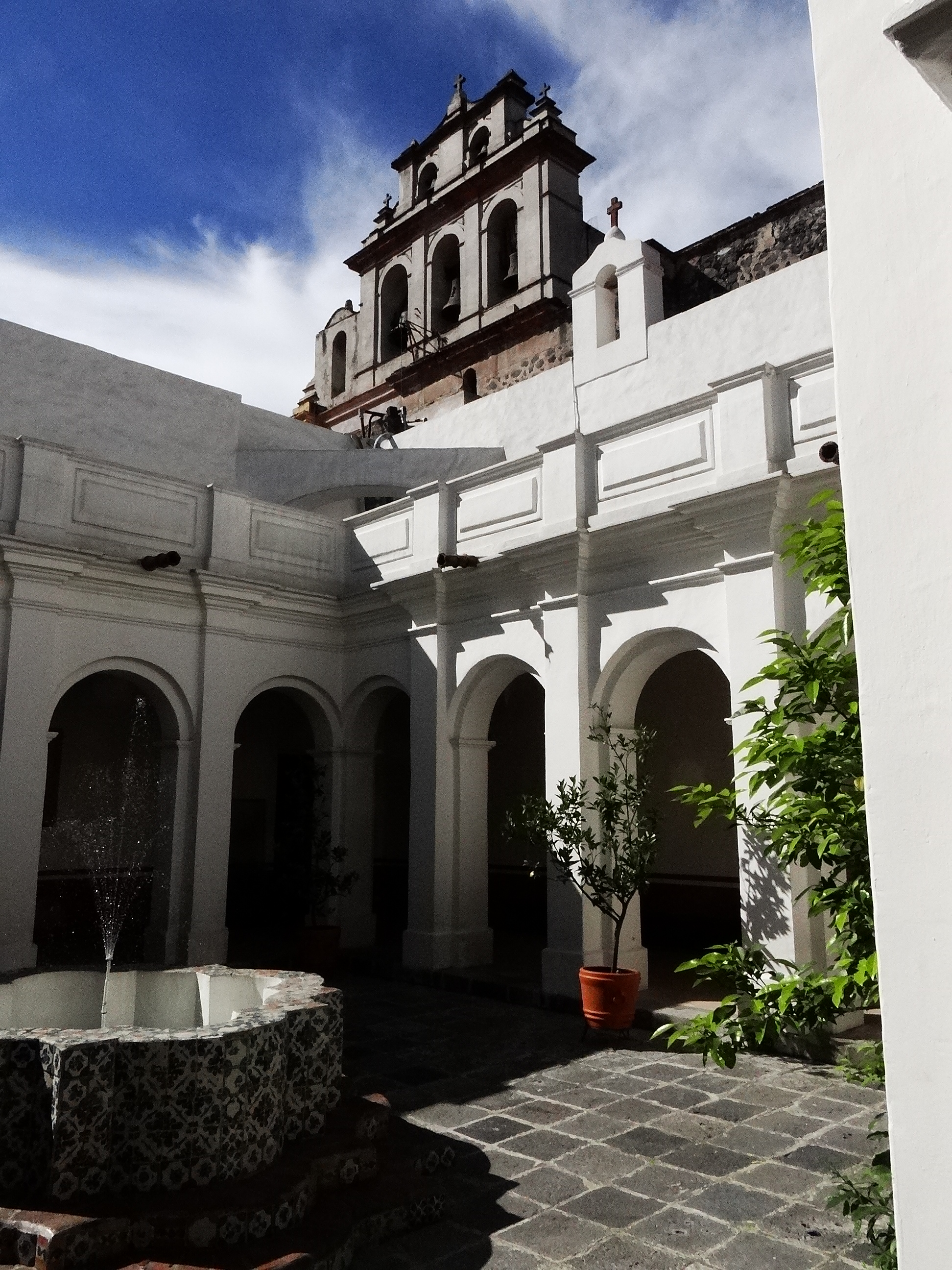
Two bell-gables at El Carmen complex in San Ángel, Mexico.

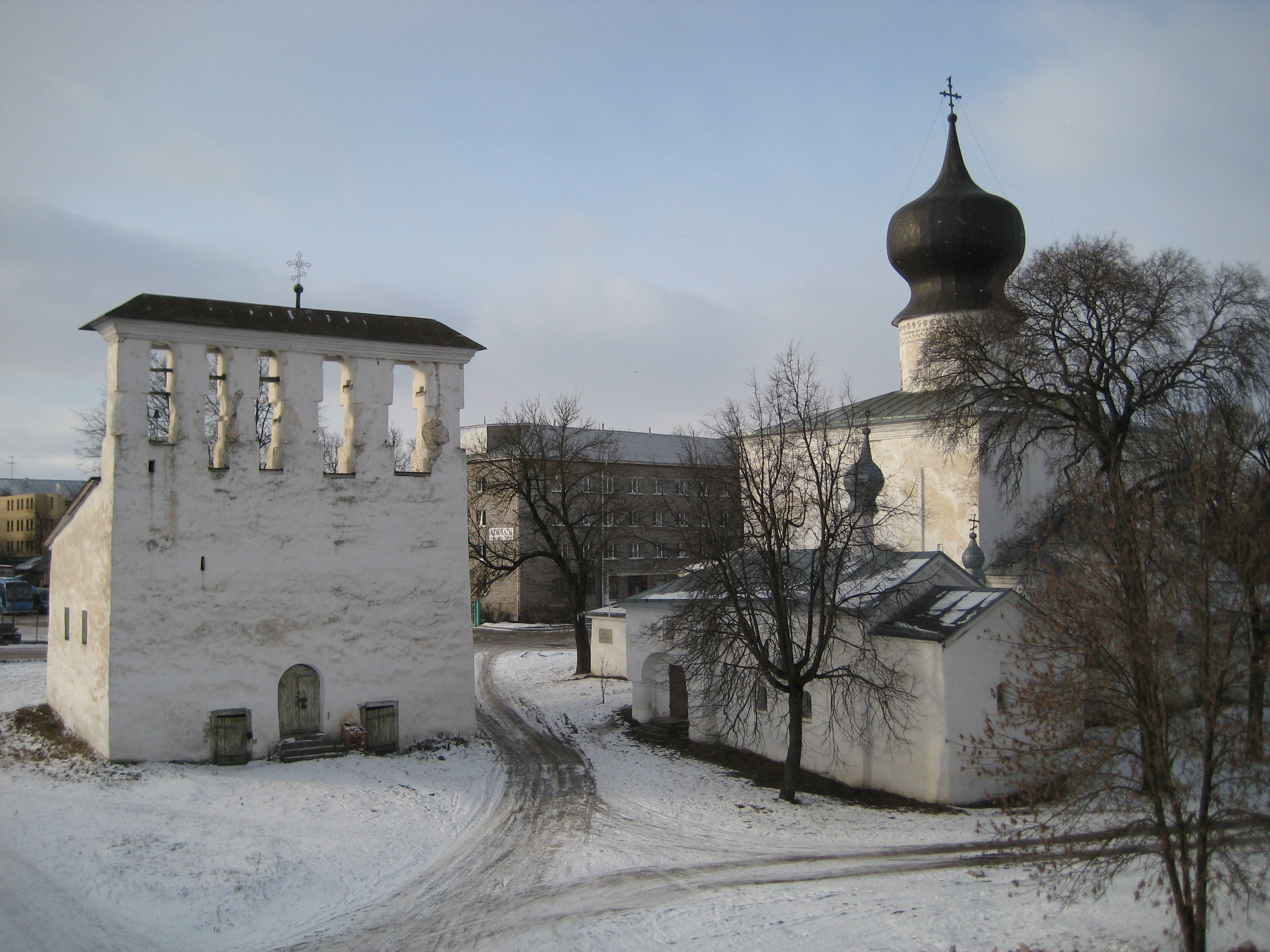
Russian bell gable at the Church of Dormition "s Paroma", Pskov

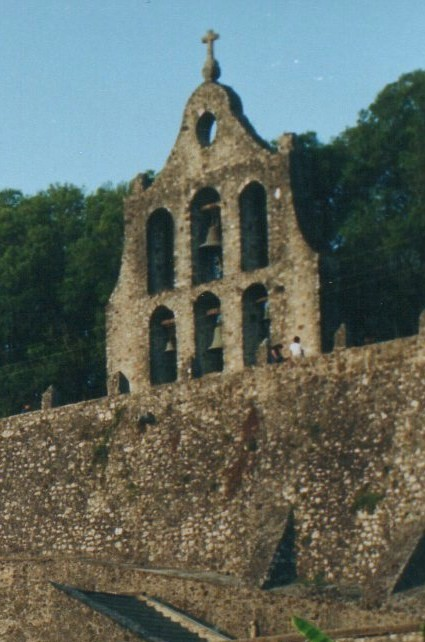
Bell-gable detached from the village church of Molango, Mexico.

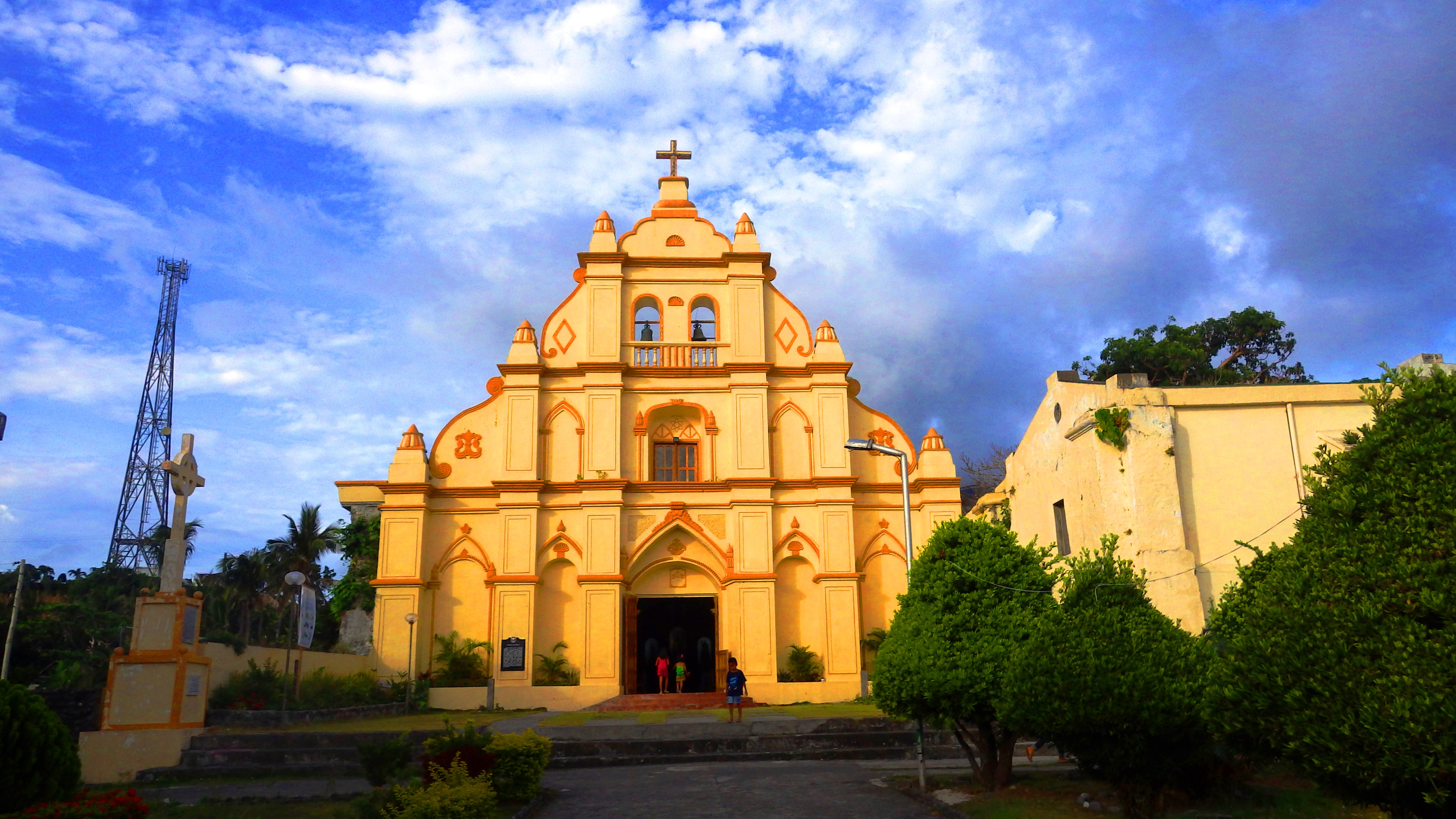
Bell-gable at Basco Cathedral, Philippines.

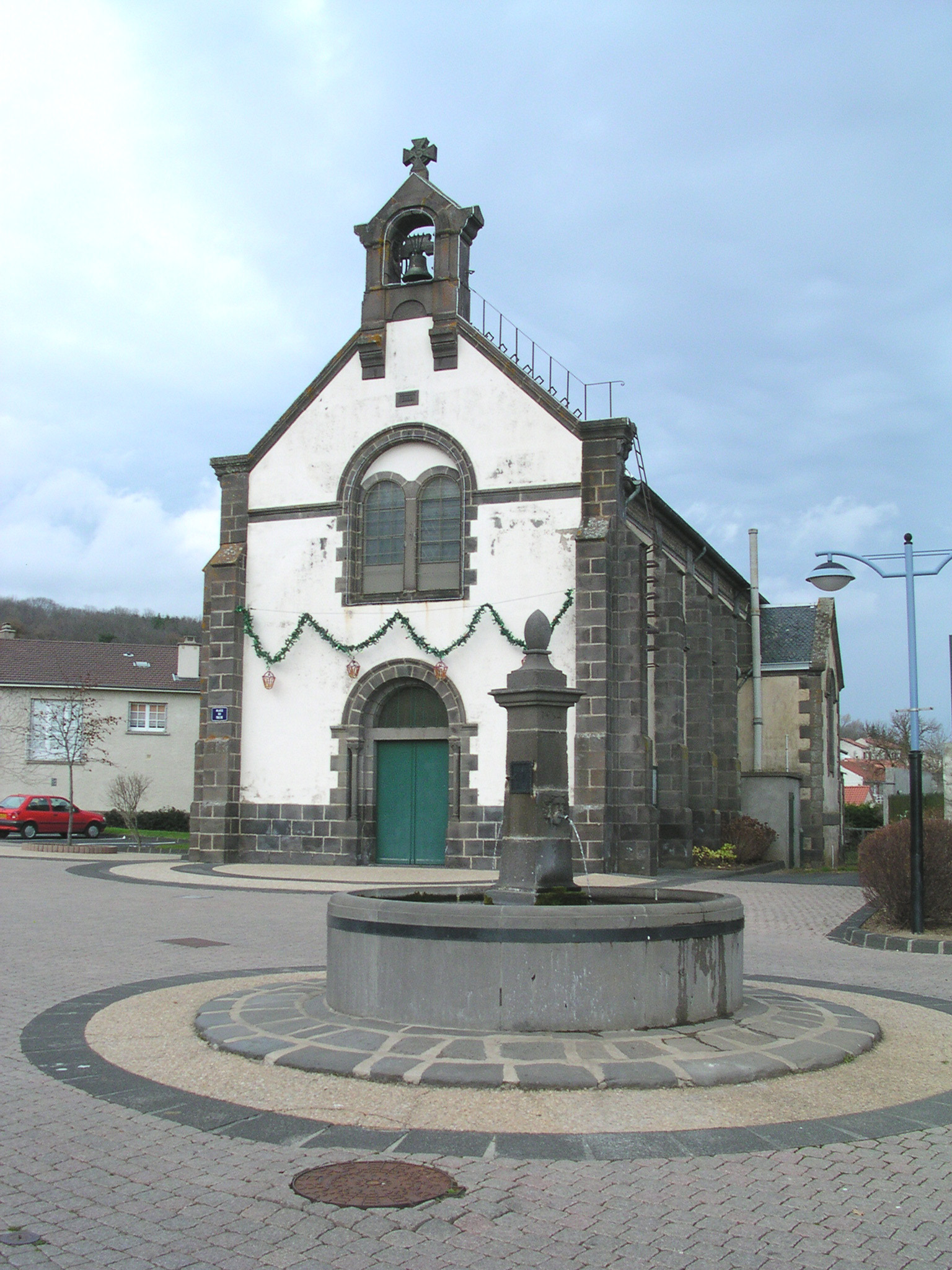
Bell-gable on the village church in Argnat, Puy-de-Dôme, France

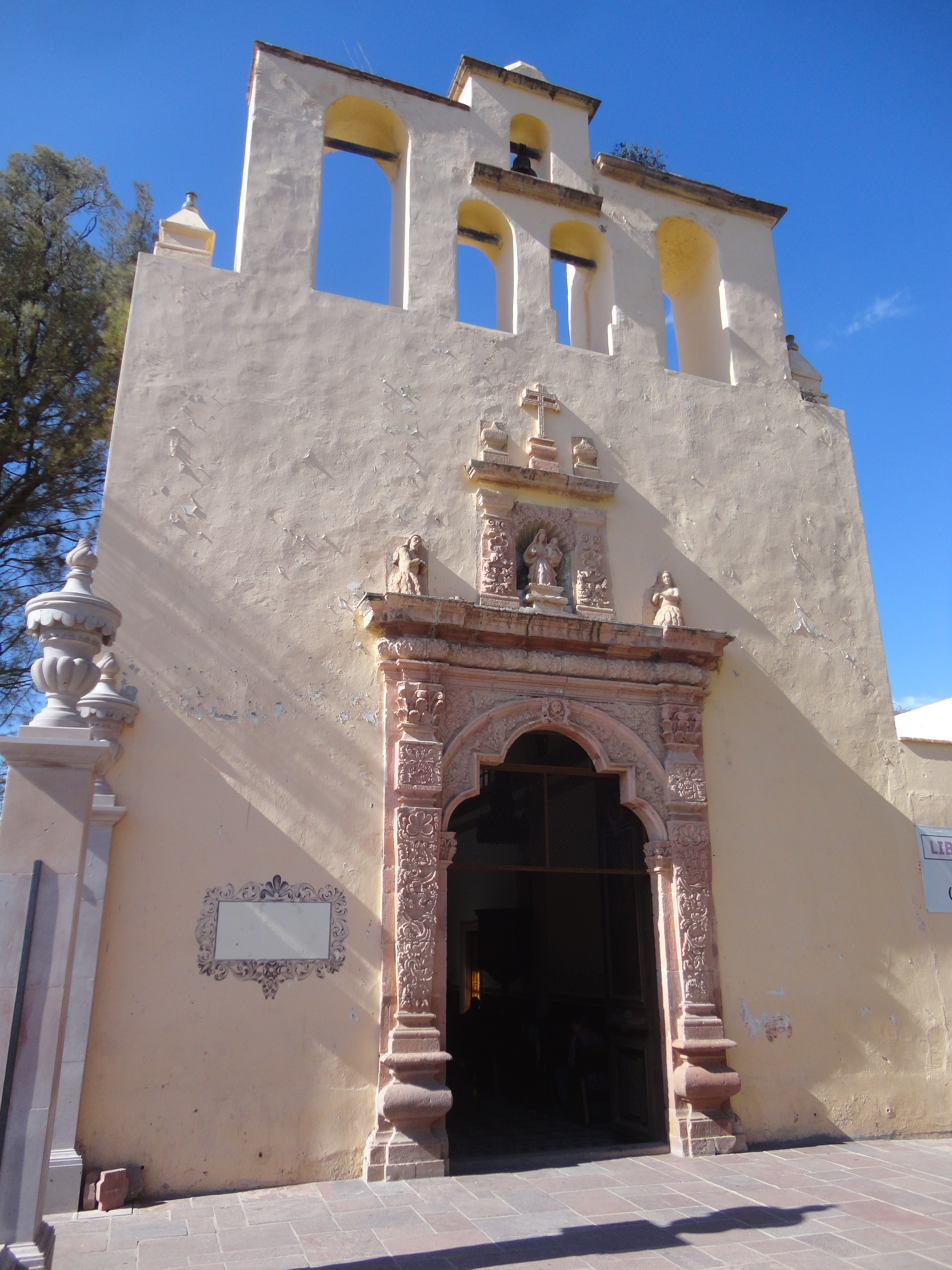
Unoccupied bell-gable in a chapel at San Luis de la Paz, Mexico.

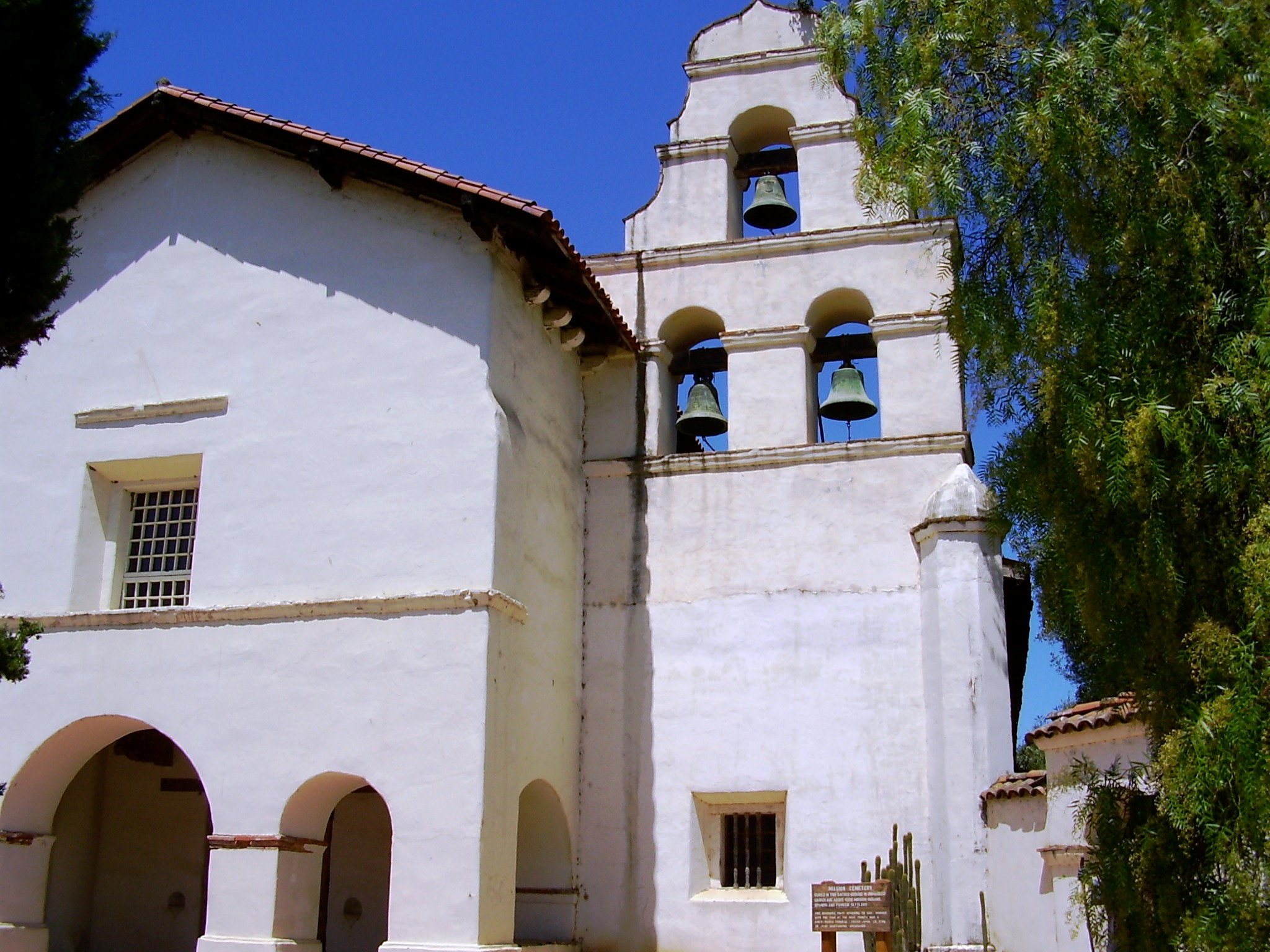
Bell-gable at Mission San Juan Bautista, United States.

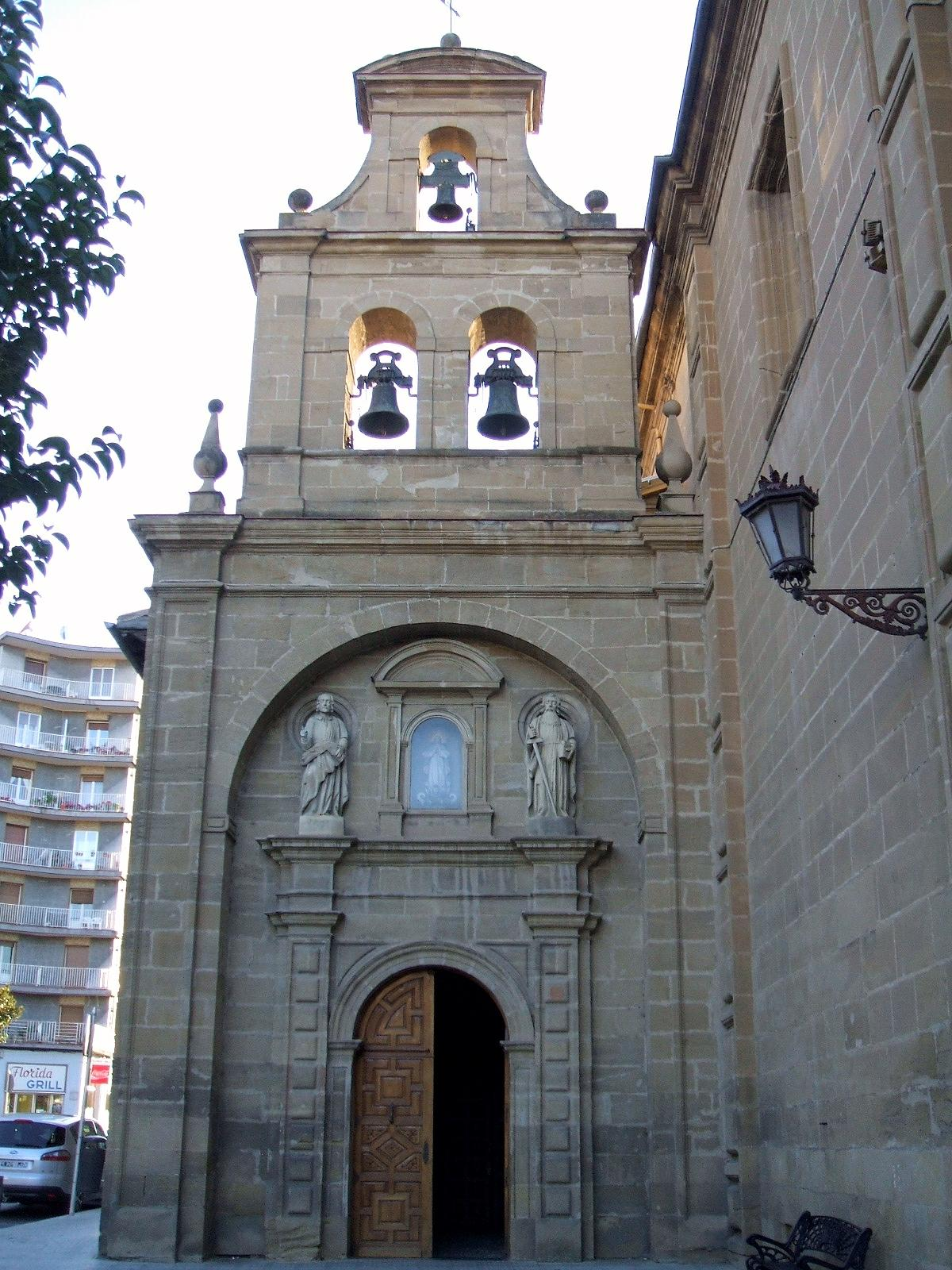
The espadaña of the Basilica de Nuestra Señora de la Vega, Haro, Spain

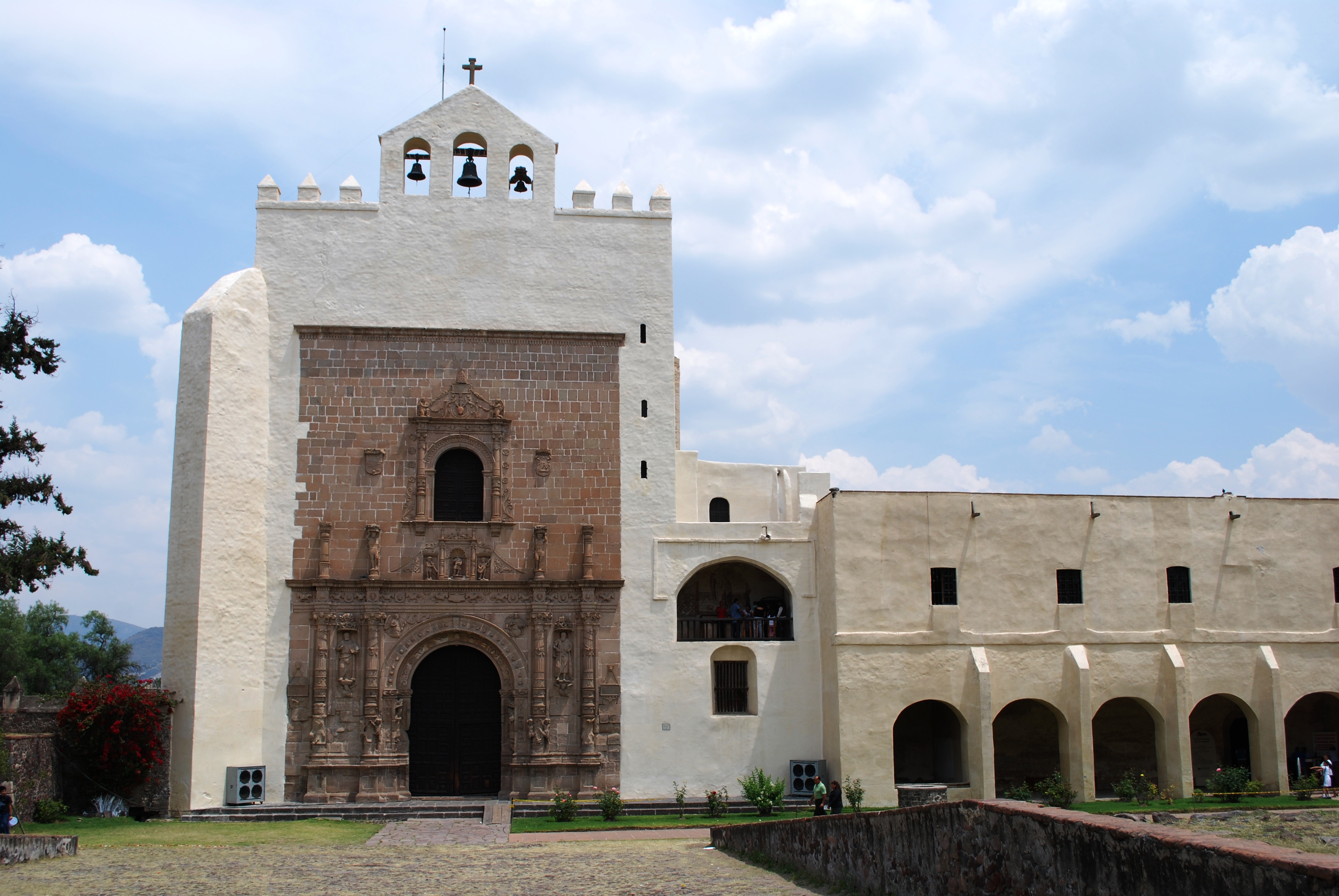
The bell-gable on top of the convent of Acolman, Mexico.

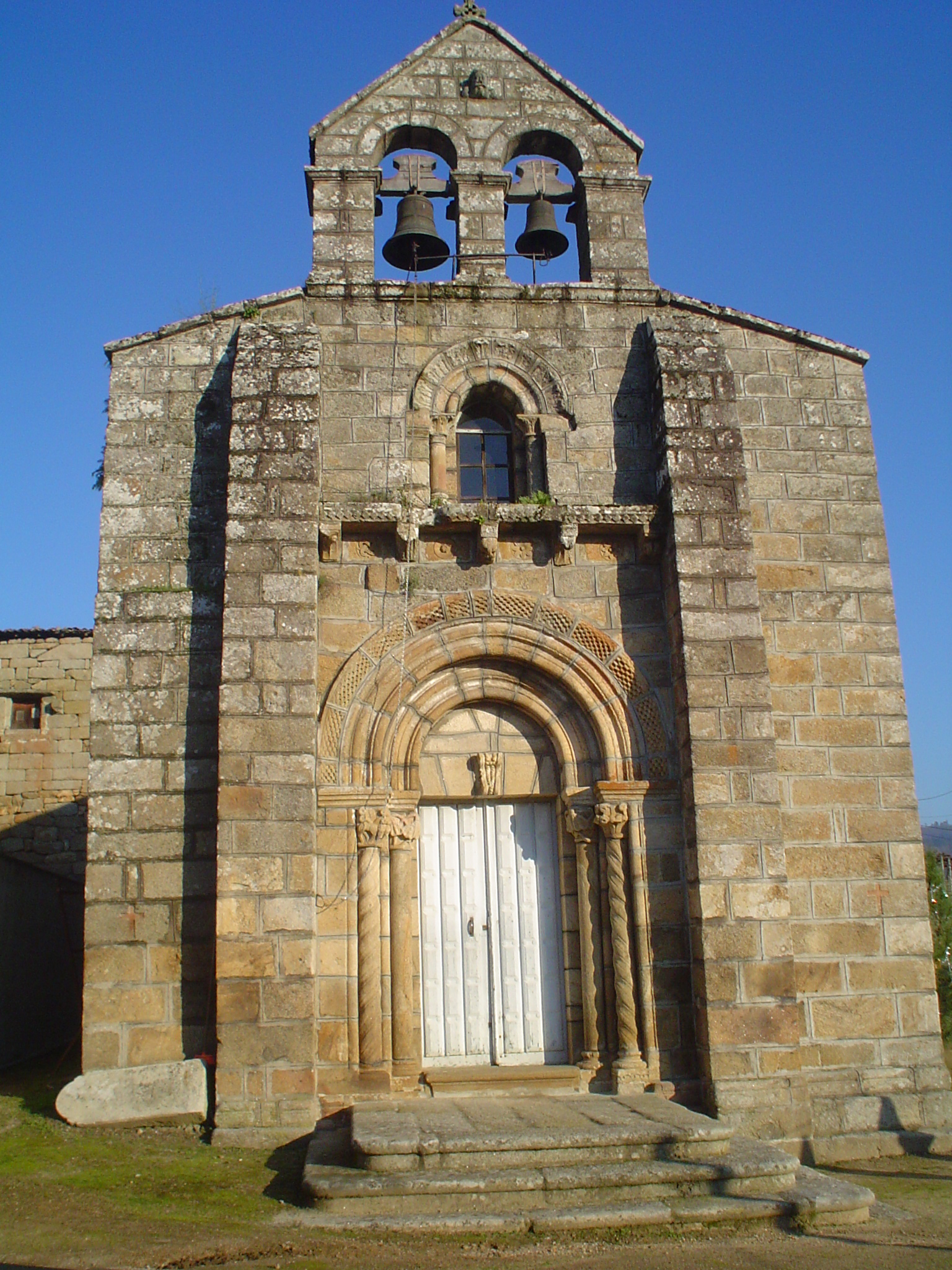
Gomariz church in Leiro, Galicia (Spain)

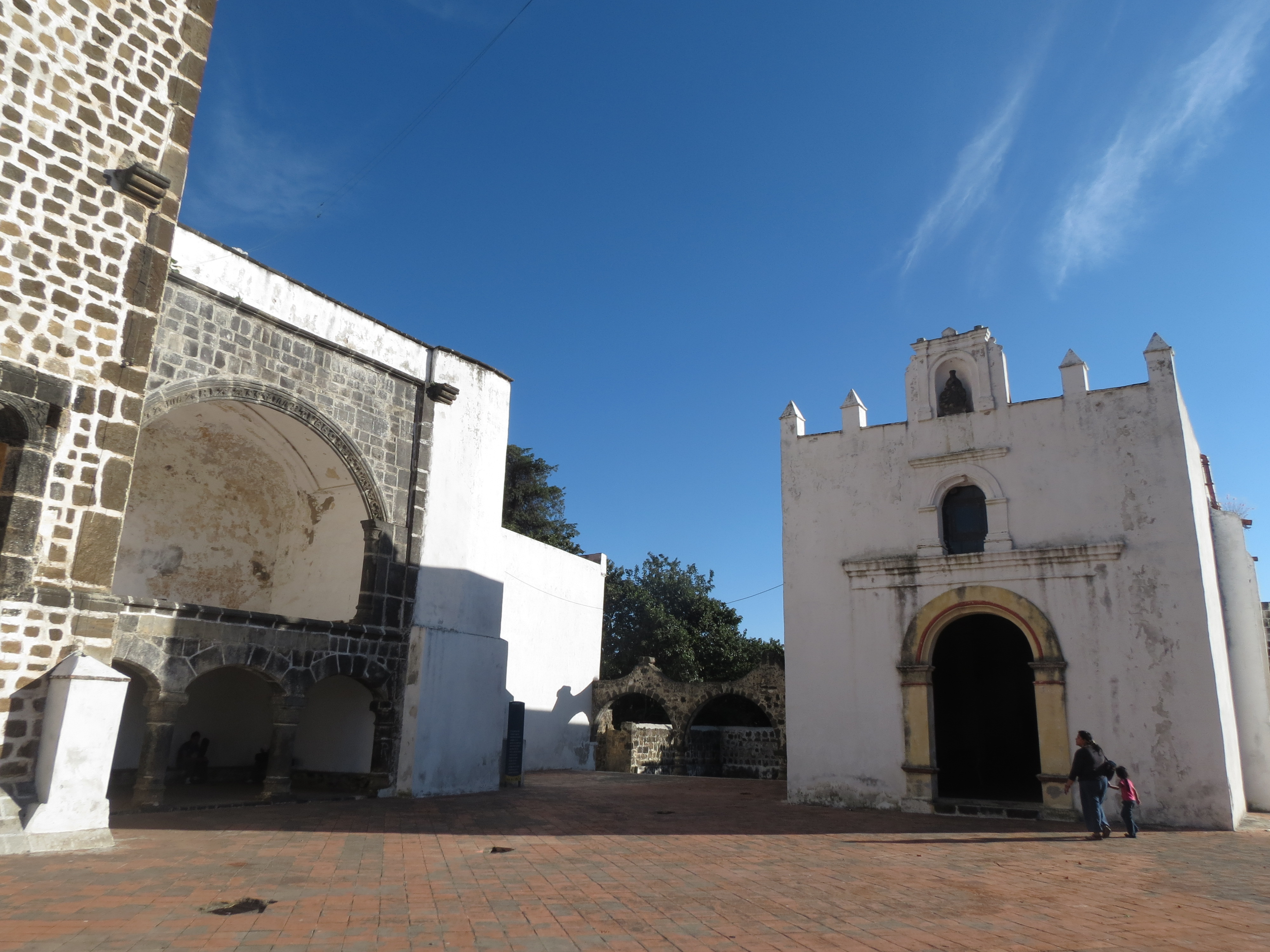
Old bell-gable at Tochimilco, Mexico, reused as a niche.

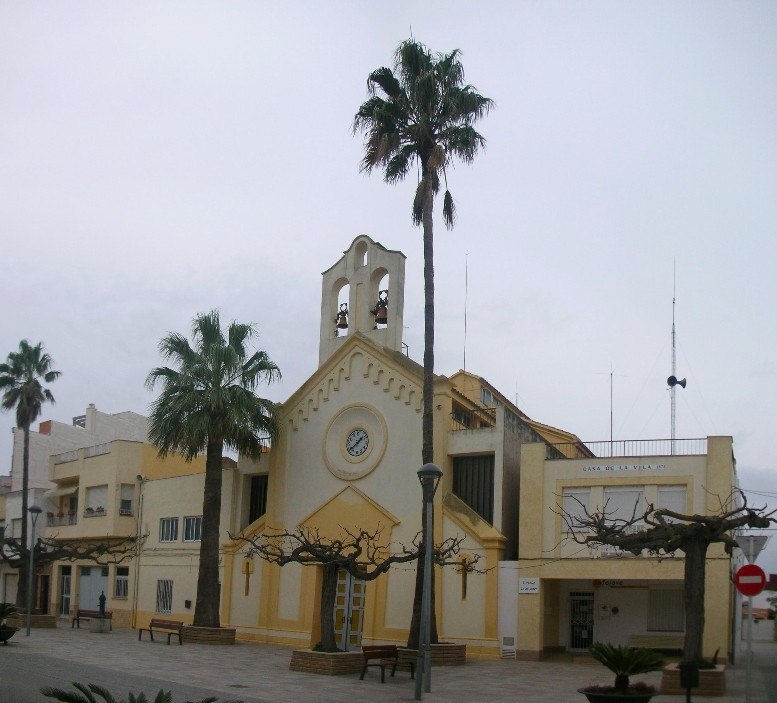
Sant Jaume d'Enveja church with its large bell-gable, Spain.

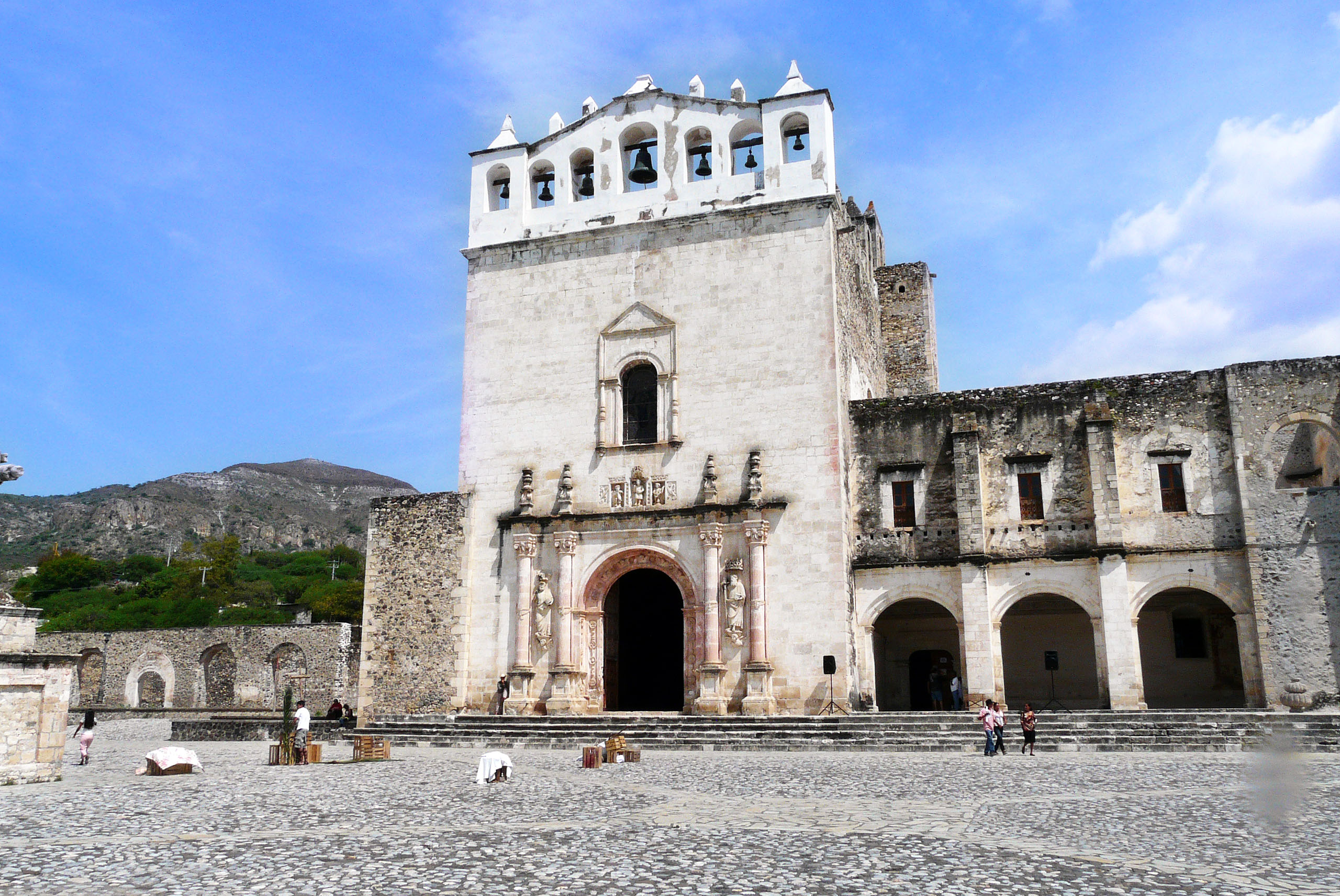
Convent in Metztitlán, Mexico, with a bell-gable on top.

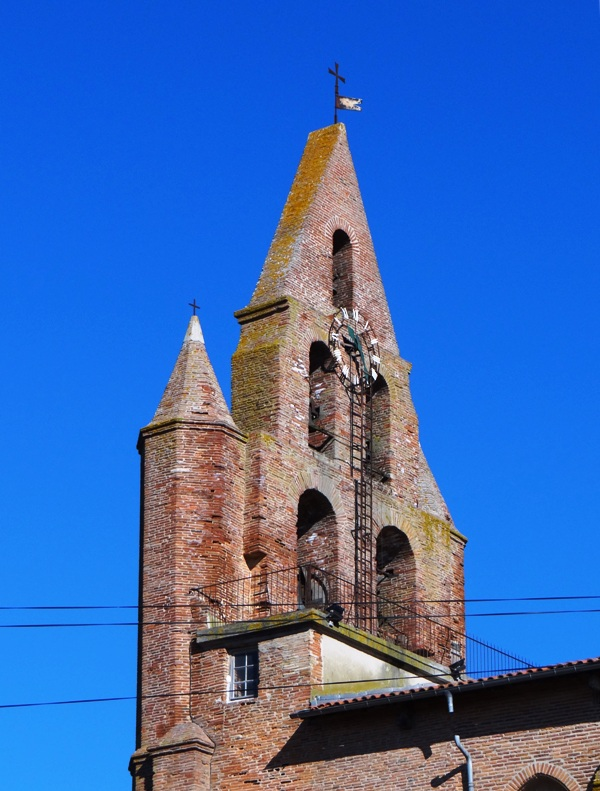
Nailloux, Haute-Garonne, France, Toulouse-type "clocher-mur"

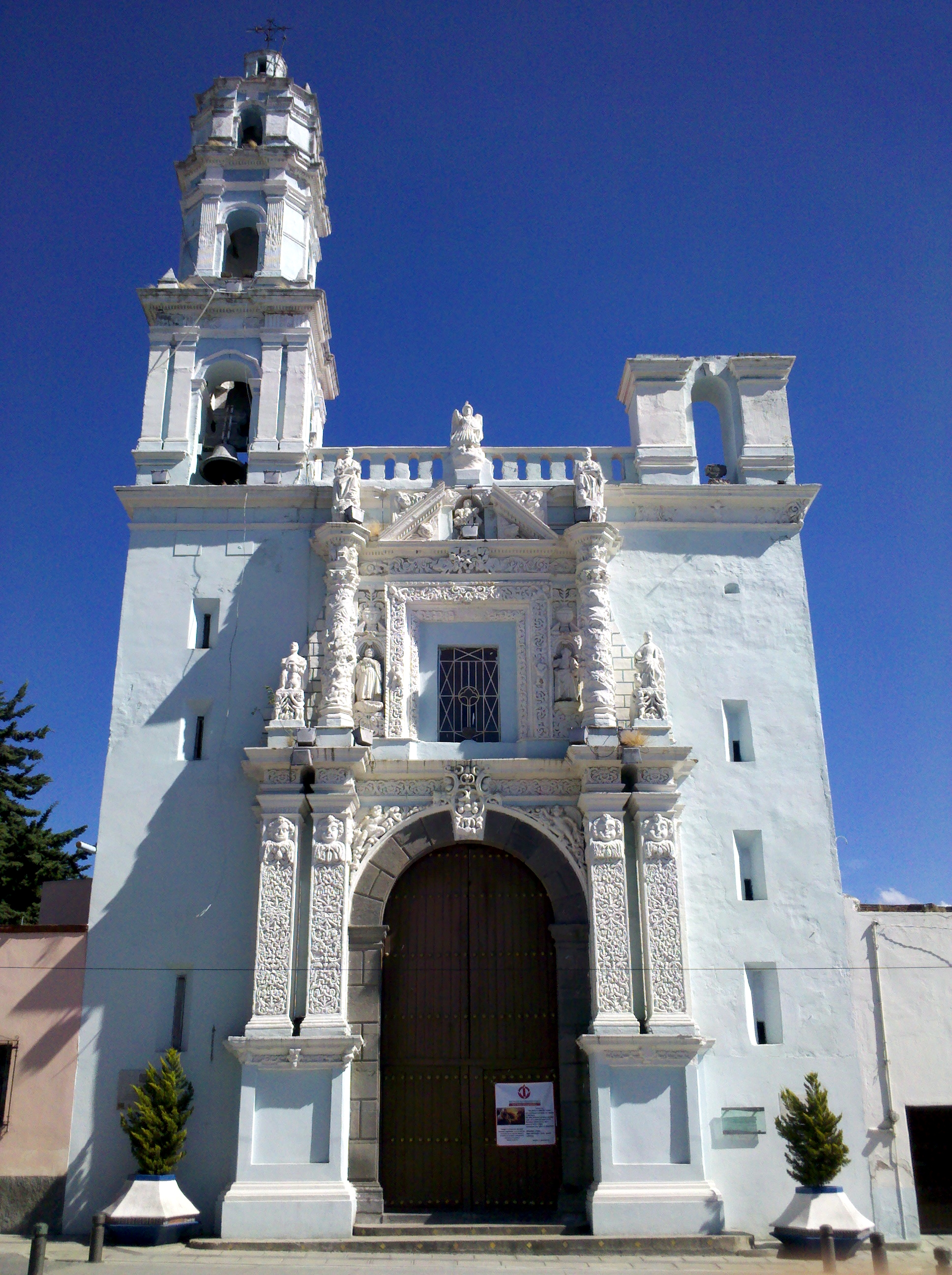
Church of Los Remedios in Puebla, Mexico, with a bell-gable to the right and a bell tower to the left.

Static bells struck by solenoid-operated hammers in a bell-gable.

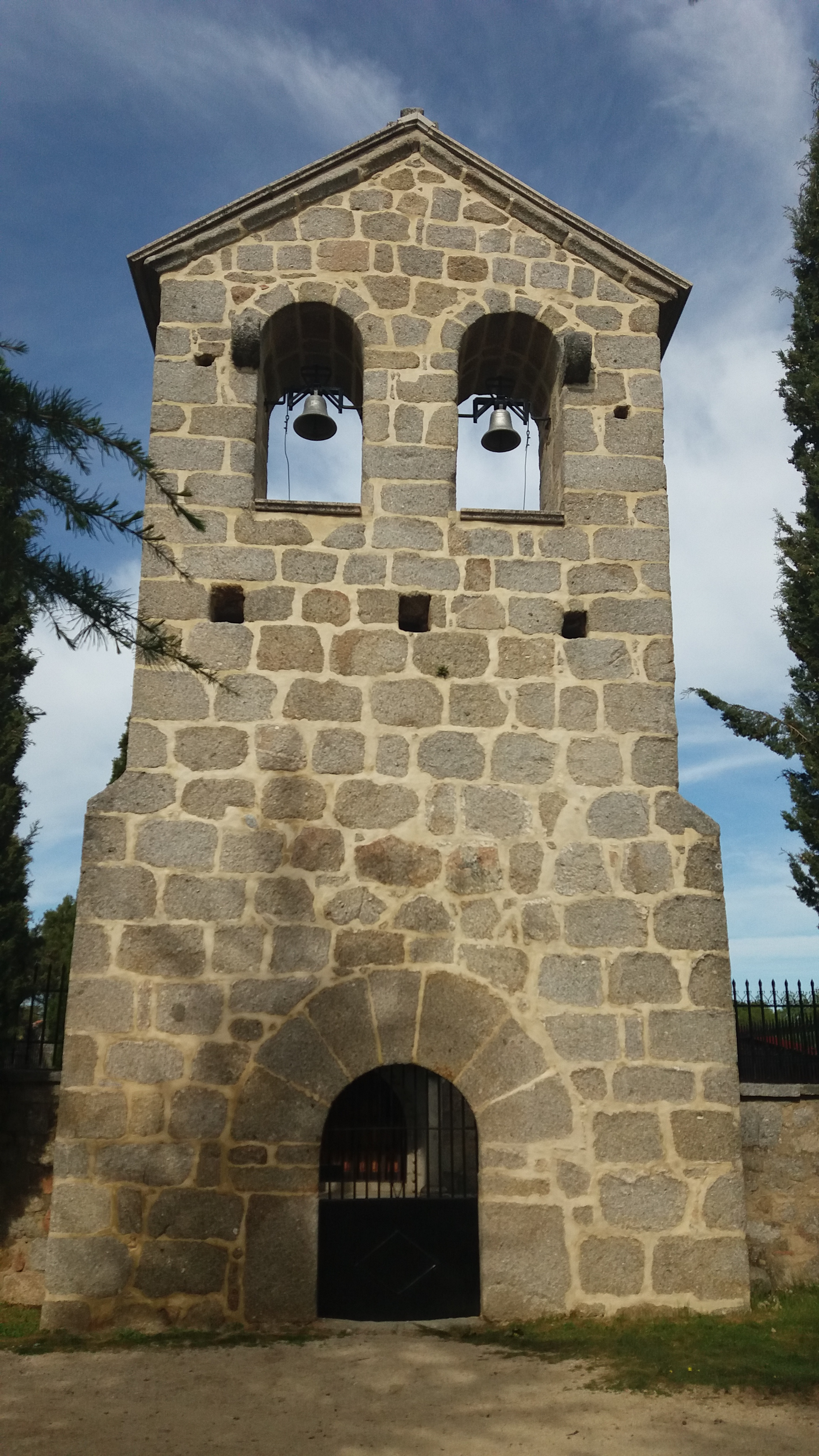
Ermita de Valmayor Valdemorillo (Spain)

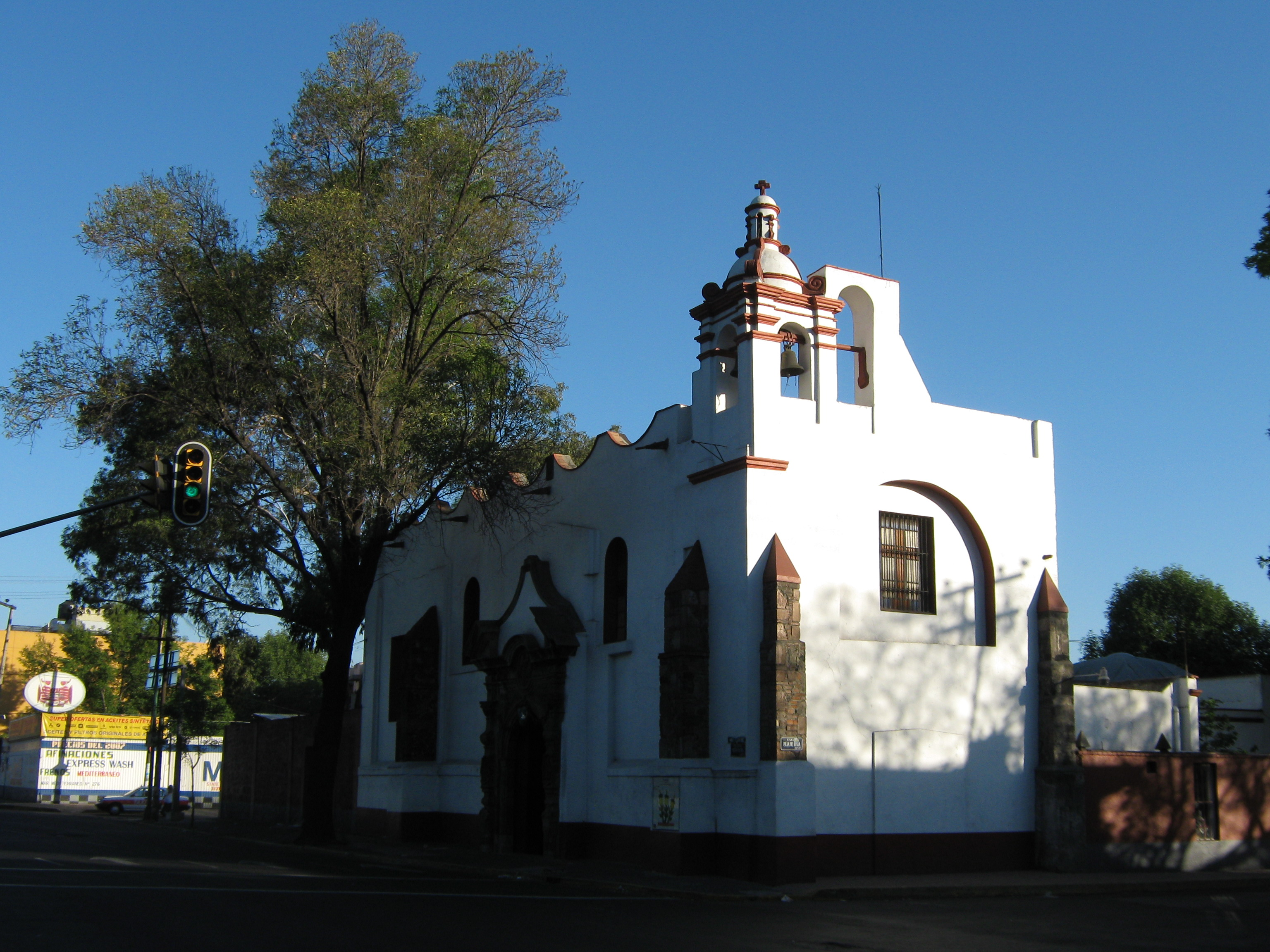
Weird bell-gable in the Merced de las Huertas church, in Mexico City. It is attached to a bell tower.

== See also ==
- Bell tower
- Zvonnitsa
