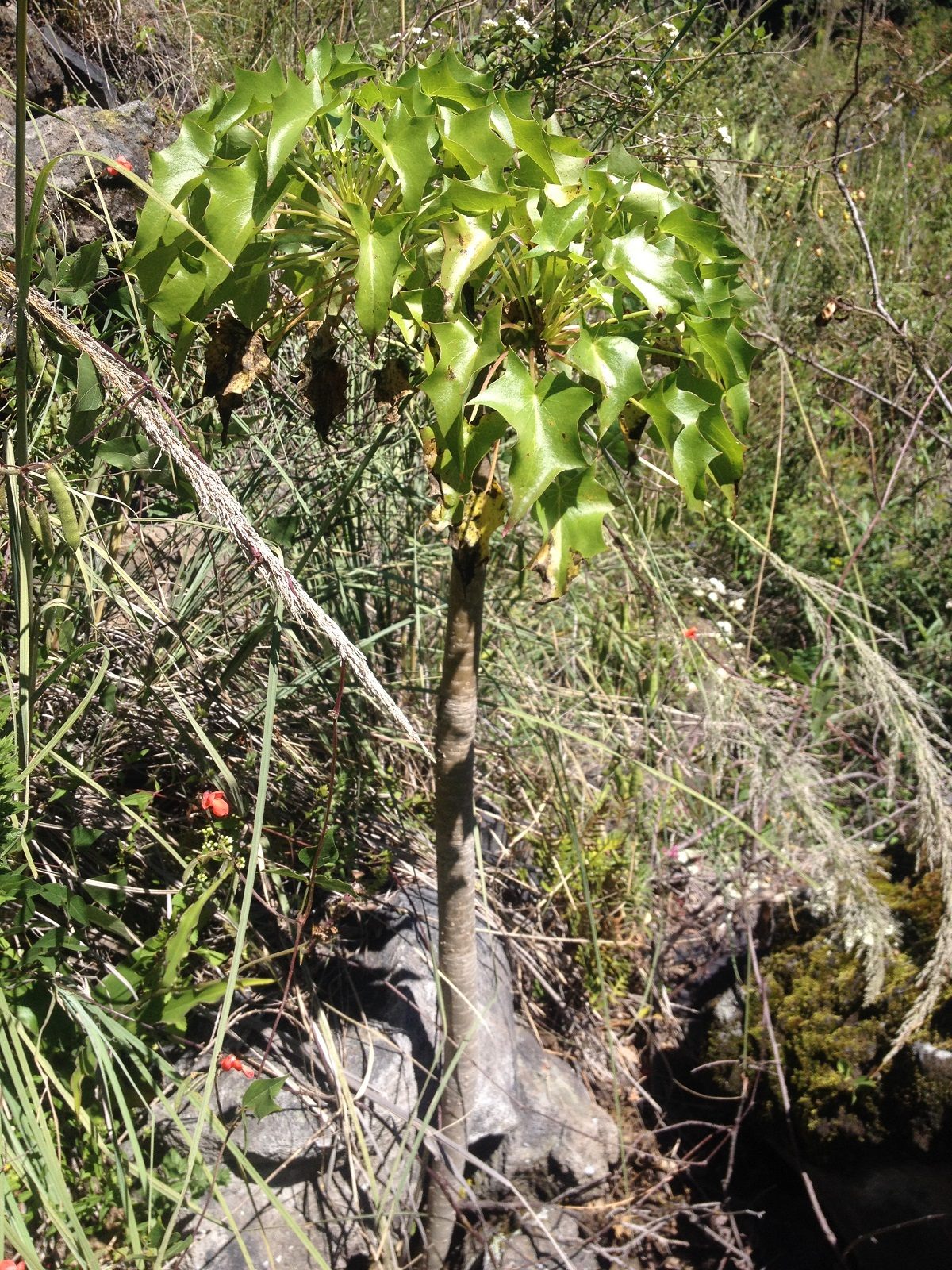
- Pittocaulon praecox

Scientific classification
- Kingdom: Plantae
- Clade: Tracheophytes
- Clade: Angiosperms
- Clade: Eudicots
- Clade: Asterids
- Order: Asterales
- Family: Asteraceae
- Subfamily: Asteroideae
- Tribe: Senecioneae
- Genus: Pittocaulon; H.Rob. & Brettell

= Pittocaulon =

Genus of plants

Pittocaulon is a genus of Mexican shrubs and small trees in the tribe Senecioneae within the family Asteraceae.

Pittocaulon is native to the dry parts of central and southern Mexico. In addition to the strange appearance of these plants, Pittocaulon is of interest due to the remarkable range of habitats in which the species occur, from dry highland scrub well above 3000 meters, to tropical dry forest in hot country as low as 300 meters and on rocks, often in very steep situations. Pittocaulon species are conspicuous when they flower at the end of the dry season are popularly called "palo loco" or "crazy tree", because they flower at the very end of the dry season when most other plants are suffering the effects of drought.

Species

Species accepted by the Plants of the World Online as of May 2023:

- Pittocaulon bombycophole (Bullock) H.Rob. & Brettell - Guerrero, México State
- Pittocaulon filare (McVaugh) H.Rob. & Brettell - Colima
- Pittocaulon hintonii H.Rob. & Brettell - Michoacán
- Pittocaulon praecox (Cav.) H.Rob. & Brettell - Mexico
- Pittocaulon velatum (Greenm.) H.Rob. & Brettell - Guerrero, Nayarit, Oaxaca, Zacatecas
