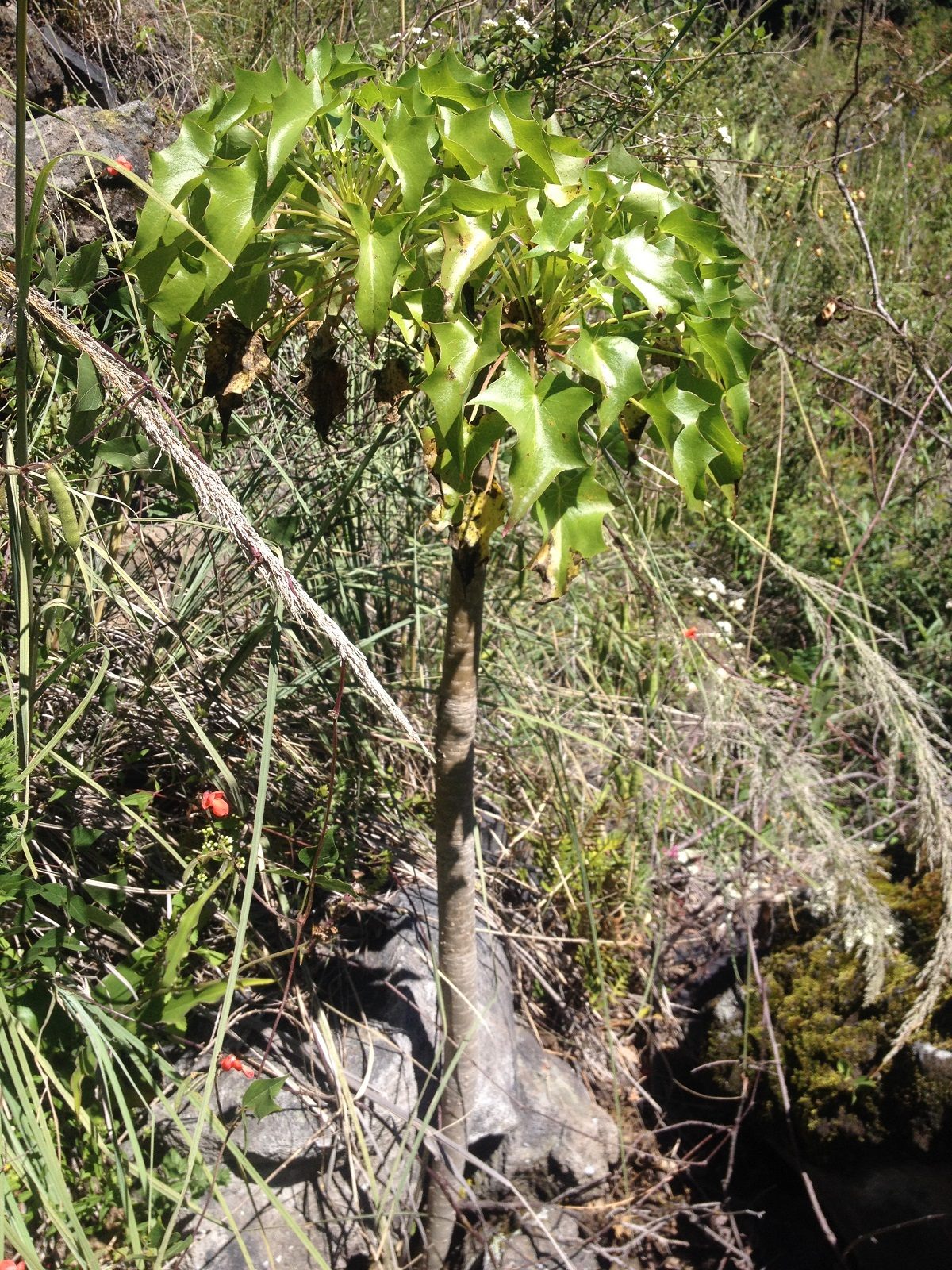

Conservation status
- Least Concern (IUCN 3.1)

Scientific classification
- Kingdom: Plantae
- Clade: Embryophytes
- Clade: Tracheophytes
- Clade: Angiosperms
- Clade: Eudicots
- Clade: Asterids
- Order: Asterales
- Family: Asteraceae
- Genus: Pittocaulon
- Species: P. praecox

Binomial name
- Pittocaulon praecox (Cav.) H.Rob. et R.D.Brettell

Synonyms
- Cineraria praecox Cav.

= Pittocaulon praecox =

Species of plant

Pittocaulon praecox is the type species for the genus Pittocaulon and family Asteraceae. This species also has the widest range of the genus.

== Description ==
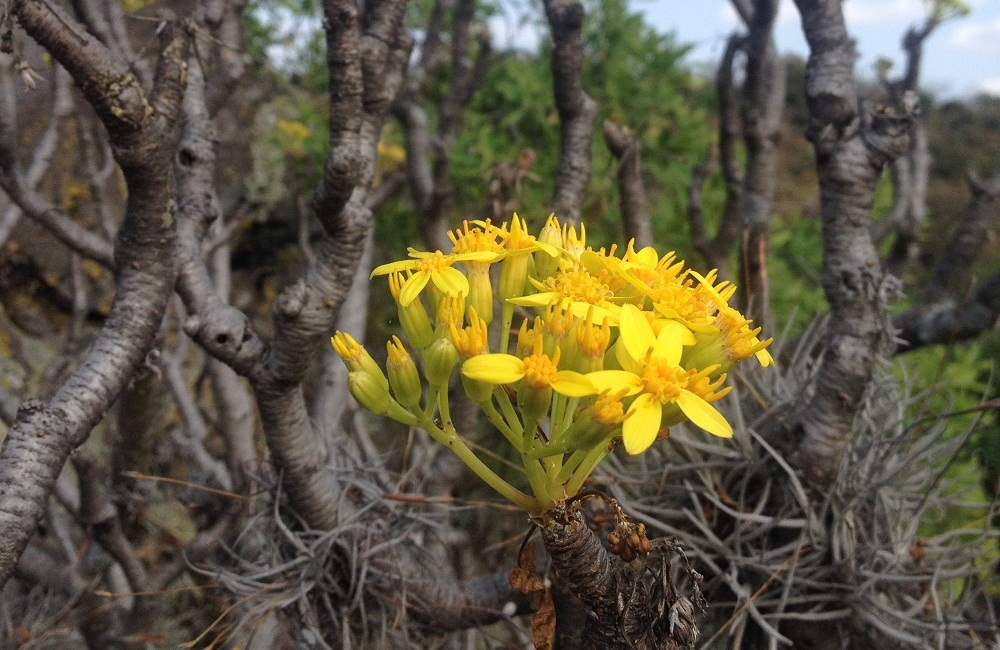
Flowers

It is a deciduous shrub or small tree up to 4 meters high. Its succulent, erect, light gray stems fork like a candelabrum. The glabrous leaves, cordate at the base, are grouped at the upper end of the branches, with petioles up to 17.5 cm long. The entire margins have 5 to 8 acuminate lobes. The inflorescences are grouped into five or six ligule that simulate yellow petals. The fruit is less than 1 cm long and is a dry cylindrical or clavate achene with a pappus of white bristles.

== Distribution ==
It is a plant native to the semi-arid and temperate zones of central and southern Mexico. Its short roots allow it to grow on thin and uneven soils. In particular, it has found a niche thriving on deposits of extrusive igneous material, such as the Nealtican malpaís and the Pedregal de San Ángel (Coyoacán, Mexico City). The proliferation of Pittocaulon praecox in the Pedregal de San Ángel has been such that its xerophytic ecosystem is usually classified as "matorral de palo loco".

== Uses ==
An infusion made from the leaves is a traditional remedy against rheumatism, wounds and dermatitis.
