= El Carmen complex =

Museum in Mexico City, Mexico

Coordinates: 19.3450°N 99.1894°W

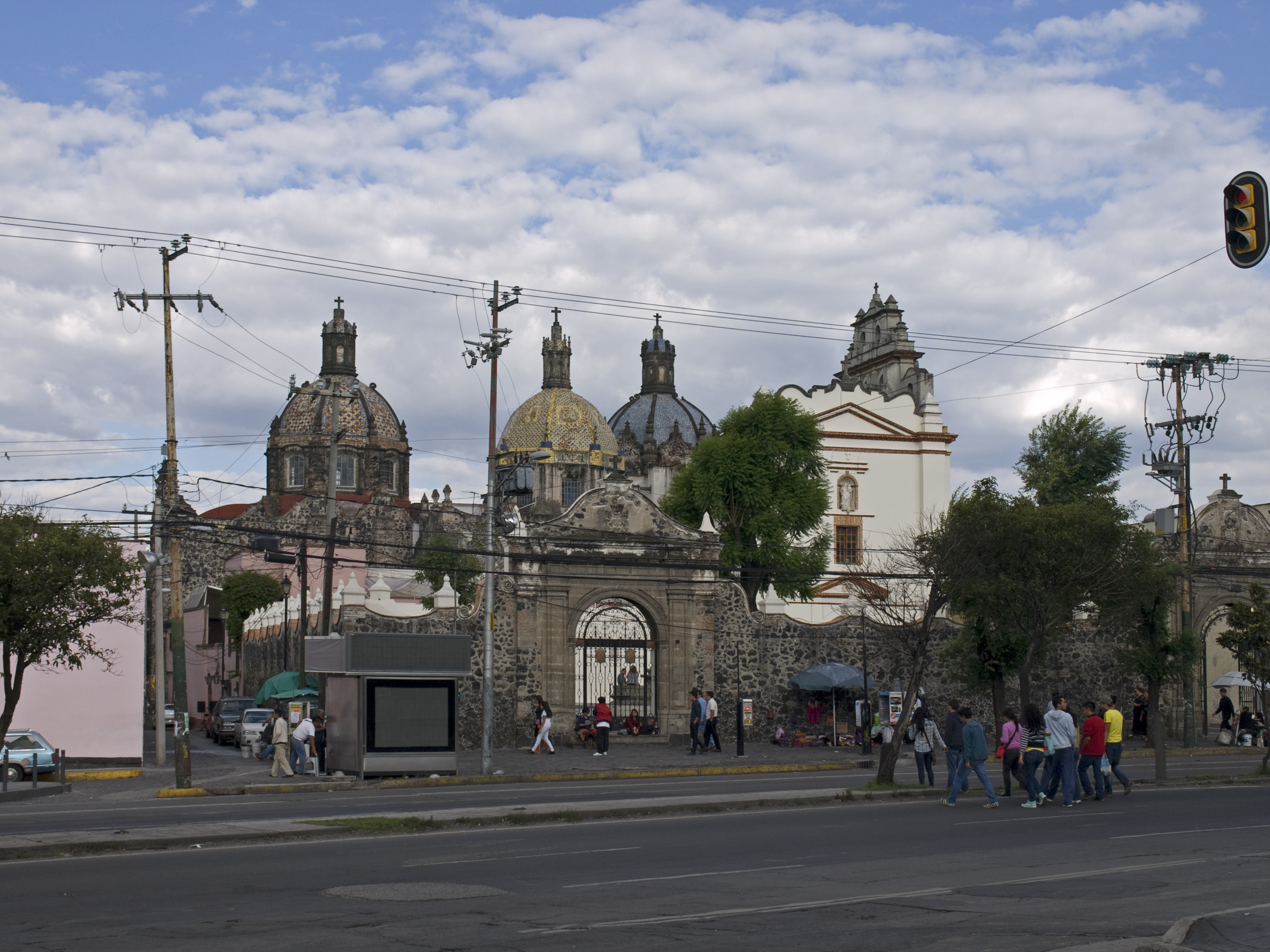
View from the west

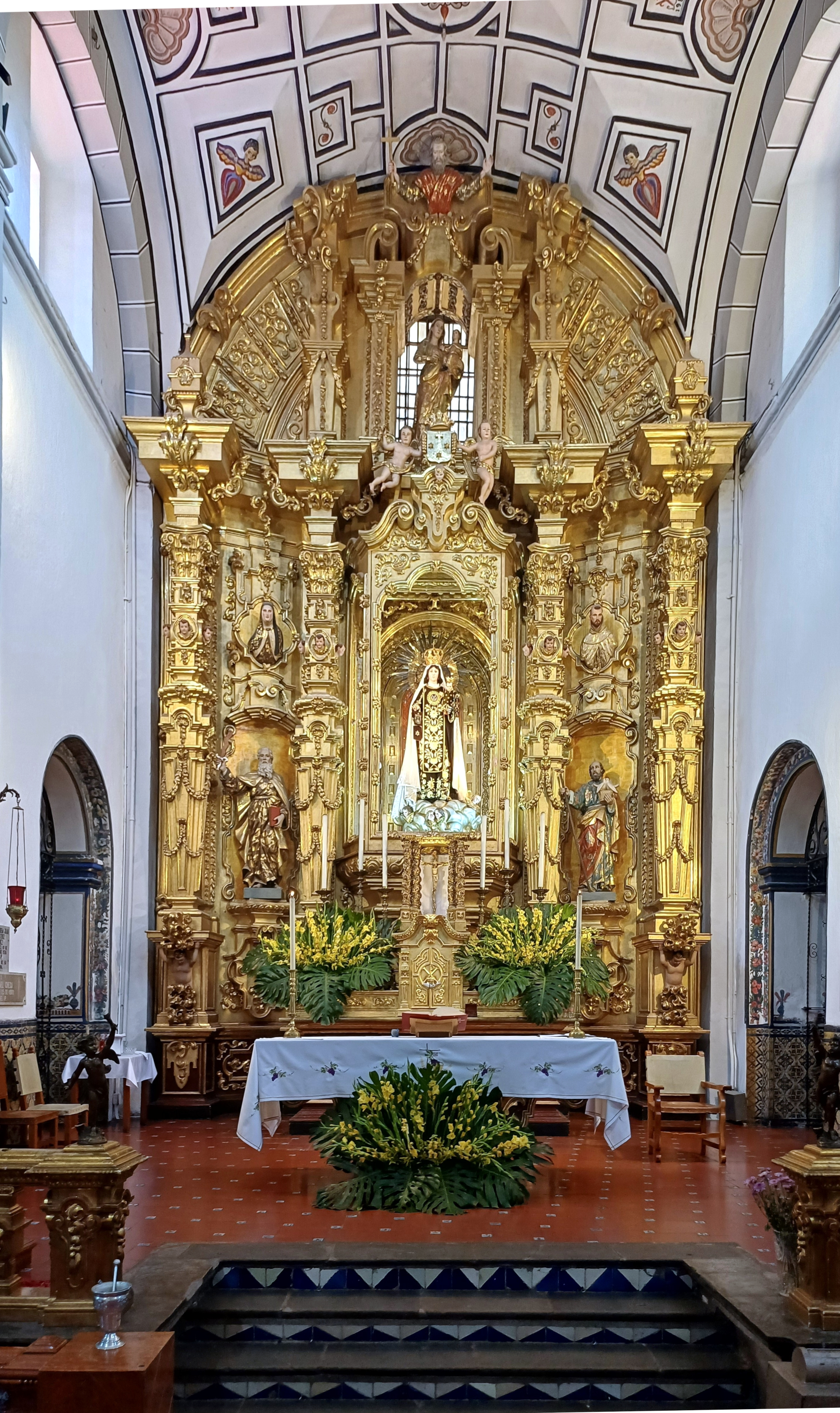
Main altarpiece

El Carmen is a former convent converted to museum in San Ángel, a southern suburb of Mexico City.

The convent was founded on 29 June 1615 by the Discalced Carmelites in the area of the Aztec village of Tenanitla, which was later renamed San Ángel. The founder was Father Andrés de San Miguel. This convent was built between 1615 and 1626. In the university, there was a college for theology students and a library, which contained more than 12,000 books. In 1858, the college was closed, and the complex was transferred to the local authorities. In 1929, the museum was created, and in 1939, it was transferred to the newly created Instituto Nacional de Antropología e Historia.

The museum contains a large collection of Mexical colonial religious art including paintings of Miguel Cabrera, as well as original furniture of the monastery, and a collection related to the history of the monastery and relates the life of the Carmelites.
