= California State Route 94 =

Highway in California

State Route 94
- SR 94 highlighted in red

Route information
- Maintained by Caltrans
- Length: 63.324 mi (101.910 km)
- Existed: 1933–present

Major junctions
- West end: I-5 in San Diego
- SR 15 in San Diego; I-805 in San Diego; SR 125 in Spring Valley; SR 54 in El Cajon; SR 188 near Tecate
- East end: I-8 near Boulevard

Location
- Country: United States
- State: California
- Counties: San Diego

Highway system
- State highways in California; Interstate; US; State; Scenic; History; Pre‑1964; Unconstructed; Deleted; Freeways
← SR 93	→ US 95

State Route 94 (SR 94) is a state highway in the U.S. state of California that is 63.324 miles (101.910 km) long. The western portion, known as the Martin Luther King Jr. Freeway, begins at Interstate 5 (I-5) in downtown San Diego and continues to the end of the freeway portion past SR 125 in Spring Valley. The non-freeway segment of SR 94 that continues east through the mountains to I-8 near Boulevard is known as Campo Road.

The Campo road served as a wagon road providing access to eastern San Diego County as well as Imperial County. The road was added to the state highway system in 1933, and signs for Route 94 were posted along local roads later that decade. Efforts to convert the western half of the route to a freeway got underway in the 1950s, and the freeway was complete by 1962 west of the road that became SR 125. Construction continued east to Avocado Road over the next few years. Various proposals for widening the highway have come from the California Department of Transportation (Caltrans), but local opposition resulted in the delay or cancellation of many of these proposals.

== Route description ==
Route 94 is defined in section 394 of the California Streets and Highways Code, and that the highway is "from Route 5 near San Diego to Route 8 west of Jacumba via Campo".

SR 94 is an east–west freeway that begins at the eastern end of the one-way couplet of F and G streets in southeast San Diego. The freeway continues through an interchange with I-5 just east of downtown. Following this, the route goes through the neighborhoods of Sherman Heights, Grant Hill, Stockton, and Mount Hope, where there is an interchange with SR 15. Shortly thereafter, SR 94 intersects I-805 in Chollas View before continuing east through Emerald Hills and Chollas Creek into the city of Lemon Grove. Passing by the Marketplace at the Grove shopping center, the freeway forms the boundary between Lemon Grove to the south and La Mesa to the north, up to the SR 125 interchange where SR 94 turns east. At this point, SR 94 leaves both cities and enters unincorporated Spring Valley and Casa de Oro.

The freeway becomes an undivided highway at Via Mercado in Rancho San Diego. SR 94 continues through Rancho San Diego by turning southeast at the Jamacha Road and Campo Road intersection, where SR 54 and CR S17 turn northeast. As Campo Road, SR 94 crosses the Sweetwater River before entering a less-developed area, winding through the communities of Jamul, Dulzura and intersecting the north end of SR 188 north of Tecate. After passing through the communities of Potrero, Campo, and the Campo Indian Reservation, SR 94 continues east onto old U.S. Route 80 (US 80) briefly before turning north on Ribbonwood Road west of Boulevard. The route ends by connecting to I-8 near Manzanita.

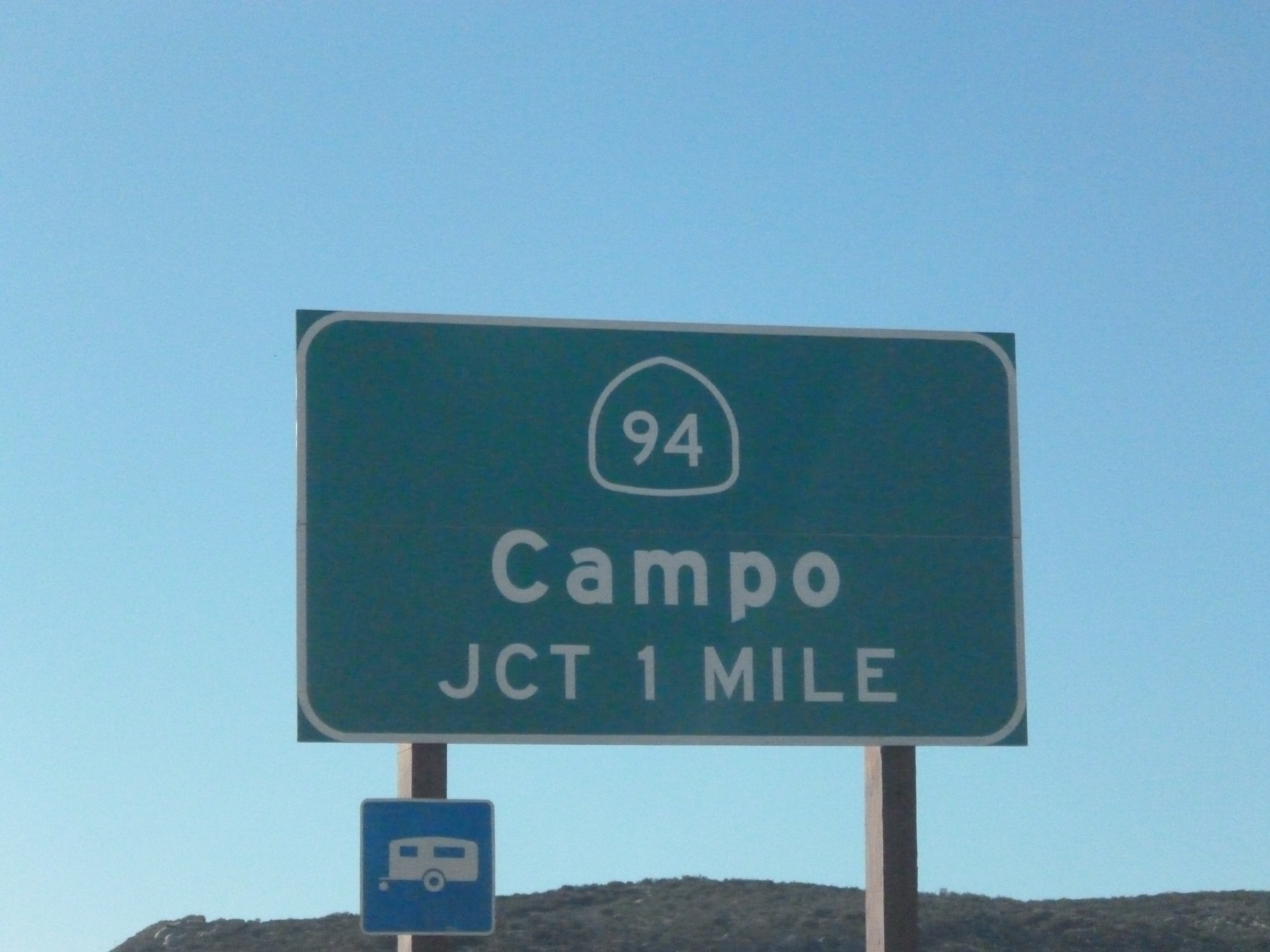
SR 94 sign off Interstate 8

SR 94 is part of the California Freeway and Expressway System; west of SR 188, it is part of the National Highway System, a network of highways that are considered essential to the country's economy, defense, and mobility by the Federal Highway Administration. SR 94 is eligible for the State Scenic Highway System, but it is not officially designated as a scenic highway by the California Department of Transportation. In 2014, SR 94 had an annual average daily traffic (AADT) of 440 vehicles at Live Oak Springs Road, and 179,000 vehicles between I-805 and 47th Street, the latter of which was the highest AADT for the highway.

== History ==
=== Campo Road ===
SR 94 was built along the routing of an old stagecoach road that was part of the primary road from San Diego to Yuma, Arizona. A trip to East County in the 19th century along the road would last two days. James Pascoe surveyed the route through Campo for the county in 1869 that was 25 miles (40 km) shorter than the existing route through Warner's Pass. The road was known for its curves, climbs, and boulders, making travel difficult. The first automobile went on the road in 1904. By 1913, an unpaved automobile road extended to Campo from San Diego, and work took place to improve the condition of the road in 1916. A year later, the road continued east to join with the state highway leading into Imperial County. In 1927, the Potrero bridge was replaced, after a storm washed it out. By 1928, the paving of the Campo road was about 43 percent complete. In February of the next year, the progress was at 74 percent; the total cost was $122,474 (about $4 million in 2024 dollars). The Sweetwater bridge was finished in March at a cost of $60,000 (about $1 million in 2024 dollars). The Campo road was the only road through the Peninsular Ranges to stay open for the entirety of the next winter; other roads were closed by snow, leading to increased traffic along this road. This was largely due to the lower elevation of the road, at only 4,000 feet (1,200 m).

=== Designation and initial construction ===
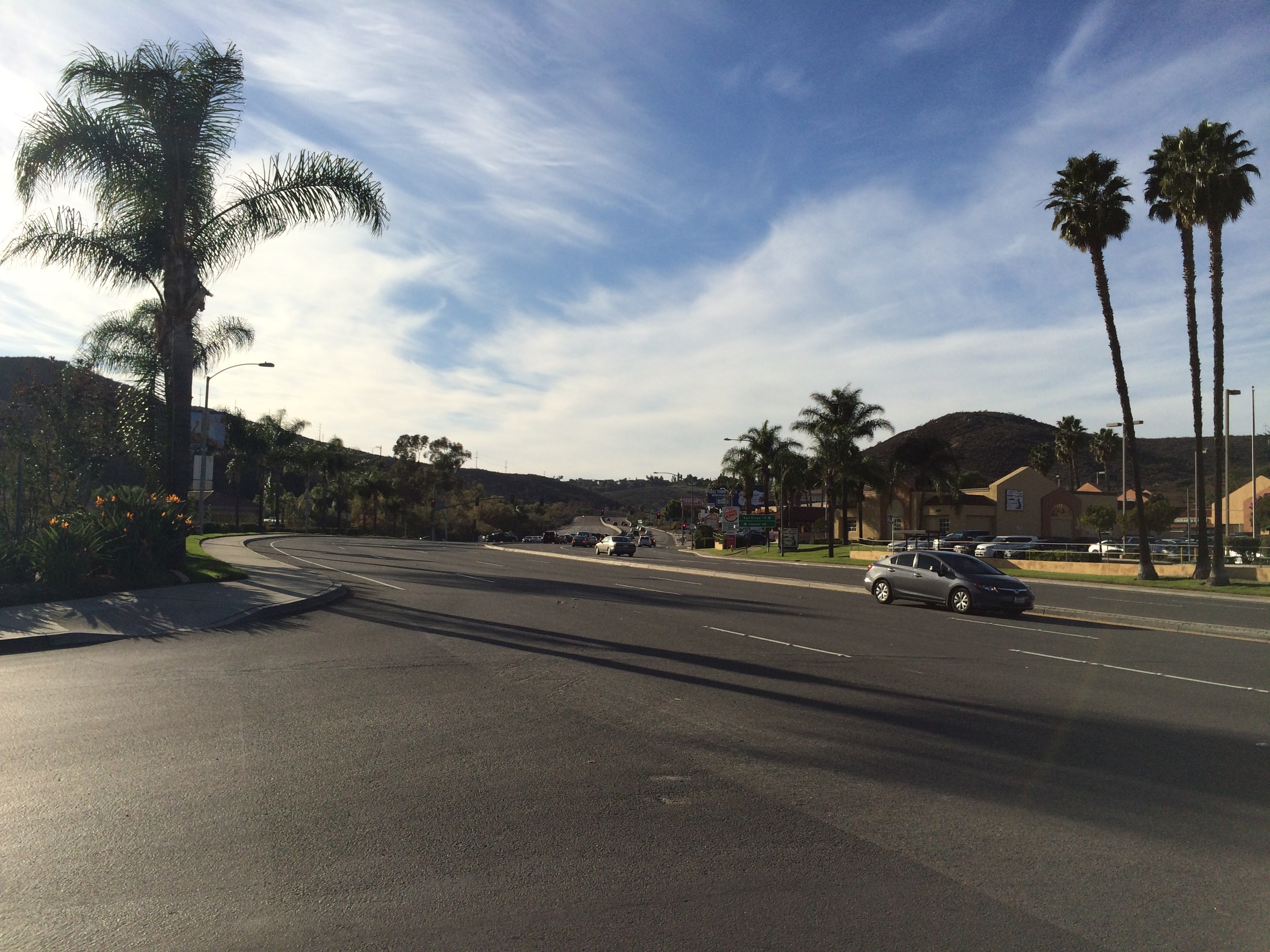
SR 94 westbound at the eastern intersection with SR 54

In 1931, the County Board of Supervisors agreed to submit the Campo road for consideration as a secondary state highway. The state considered the inclusion of the Campo road into the system in 1932. The California State Legislature defined Route 200 in 1933 as a route from San Diego to west of Jacumba, going through the town of Campo. The San Diego Chamber of Commerce sent a representative to ask the state for funding for paving the Campo highway in 1935, and the road was paved that year. The Chamber also asked for the war department to declare the road a military highway to receive federal assistance for its improvement. Signs were posted for SR 94 in 1937, and by 1938, SR 94 was signed along Broadway and Lemon Grove Boulevard (later Federal Boulevard) before continuing east to Campo.

The next year, the California Highway Commission declined to have the Campo road improved. However, the Highway 94 association, as well as the Campo-Potrero and Highway 80 chambers of commerce raised concerns about the safety of the children going to school in the buses along the road. In 1952, the Southern California committee of the state Chamber of Commerce recommended to the California Highway Commission that Route 94 be widened to four lanes from the Wabash Freeway to Jamacha. In June 1953, the Commission approved an eight-lane freeway for Route 94 from Home Avenue in San Diego to Palm Avenue around La Mesa. The local Board of Education also gave their approval, which was required because the freeway would be built on land that was for a proposed school. But the next month, State Senator Fred Kraft criticized the proposal because he believed that it would be too expensive and would not reduce congestion in the long term. Approval extended to the junction with US 80 by October 1953; the part from 18th Street to Wabash Boulevard followed in November 1954. Later that year, a toll road that would have tunneled under the Laguna Mountains and bypassed Route 94 was proposed by the county Board of Supervisors. The state allocated $3.48 million (about $32 million in 2024 dollars) for making SR 94 a freeway from College Avenue to Campo Road in October 1954.

Construction began on the first part of the SR 94 freeway just west of Lemon Grove by May 1955. The contract for the College Avenue to Campo Road portion was given out in October, for $2.9 million (about $26 million in 2024 dollars). Preparation for bidding on the portion from the Wabash Freeway to near Euclid Avenue took place towards the end of the year; construction was underway by May 1956, as was planning for the portion west of there to the intersection of 18th and F streets and the future interchange with US 101 (Now I-5). The San Diego City Council requested that an overpass be constructed at 22nd Street to provide improved access; an underpass for the road was eventually built. The freeway from Wabash Boulevard and 56th was completed on March 18, 1957; metal-weakened plane joints were used for the construction, which the California Division of Highways considered "experimental" at the time. East of College Avenue, some unwanted cracks developed in the roadway during the joint pouring process, and were repaired with epoxy. At one point in 1958, SR 94 was considered as a possible extension of US 90, a route proposed to run along the southern border of the United States to Florida, by the South Bay Highway Association. By August, SR 94 from Palm Avenue to Jamacha was being planned.

The western end of SR 94 connecting to US 101 was put up for the bidding process in late 1958. Construction on the interchange with US 101 began in 1961. By January 1962, the freeway was mostly complete west of La Mesa and the freeway connection to US 80. The part of the freeway from 25th to 17th streets was completed in November. In the 1964 state highway renumbering, SR 94 was officially designated from I-5 to I-8 near Jacumba, and SR 125 was designated from SR 94 near La Mesa north to SR 56.

=== Expansion and naming ===
Land acquisition for the construction of the SR 94 freeway through Spring Valley had begun by 1965. The next year, a plan to reroute and widen portions of SR 94 from the Sweetwater River to I-8 was underway, with a Caltrans proposal to remove the "Frenchy's" or "Three Springs" curve. In March 1968, the San Diego Highway Development Association considered the construction of the freeway from SR 125 to Jamacha Junction a priority. The state announced in August that the Spring Valley widening project would be funded earlier than anticipated, because of the state of the economy. Meanwhile, a $1.8 million (about $12 million in 2024 dollars) contract to widen SR 94 to eight lanes from Wabash Boulevard to Waite Drive in Lemon Grove was awarded in October. The freeway from Kenwood Drive to Avocado Boulevard in Spring Valley was completed in July 1970.

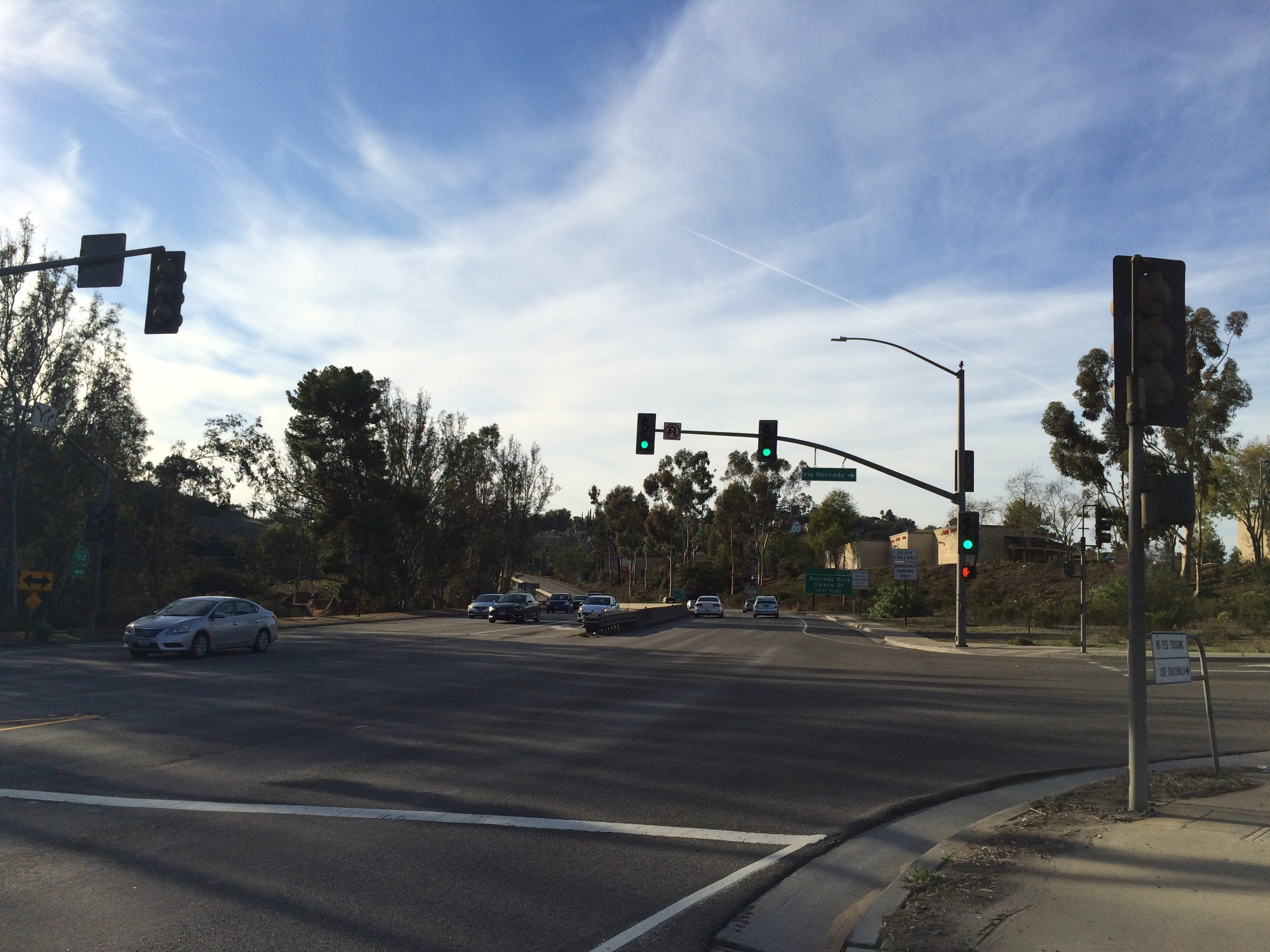
The eastern end of the SR 94 freeway

An improved interchange with SR 125 was being planned in 1974, which would connect to the existing freeway extending to Avocado Boulevard. Construction began in October, and continued into late 1975, at a cost of $11 million (about $50 million in 2024 dollars); the road was predicted to reduce traffic at the intersection of Campo Road and Bancroft Drive, and interchanges at Spring Street and Lemon Grove Avenue were to be built. The Lemon Grove Avenue interchange was open by January 30, 1976, and parts of the interchange with Spring Street and SR 125 was open by July 20.

By 1977, much of the SR 94 freeway was congested, with 85,000 to 95,000 trips per day on the freeway according to Caltrans. It was hoped that the construction of SR 54 to the south and SR 125 would reduce traffic by 20,000 trips per day. Onramp meters were installed in 1978 to throttle traffic entering the freeway with a centralized computer system; this resulted in reduced congestion on the freeway, according to motorists. In 1987, the bridge over the Sweetwater River that had been used for 58 years was replaced by a new bridge, at a cost of $2.3 million (about $5 million in 2024 dollars); construction had been delayed by nine months by concern over environmental harm to the least Bell's vireo.

The highway was designated the Martin Luther King Jr. Freeway by the California State Legislature in September 1989, after a two-year struggle to find a suitable tribute to King in the San Diego area. Nevertheless, the measure did not include funding for the signs, and as a result, they were not installed until 1998, when they were funded by the San Diego Association of Governments with $1.4 million (about $2 million in 2024 dollars) from a local sales tax.

In 1995, a U.S. Border Patrol checkpoint was opened near Dulzura, to combat human and drug trafficking that used SR 94, as well as fatal traffic accidents resulting from such smuggling. Two years later, following a proposal to widen SR 94 from Otay Lakes Road to SR 188 to address the high rate of accidents, local residents raised concerns about this proposal. In July 1998, the Back Country Coalition sued Caltrans concerning the short length of the environmental impact report as well as not soliciting comments from the public; opponents pushed for a ban of all trucks on the highway. Caltrans agreed to hold another hearing in an out-of-court settlement, as well as to pay $20,000 for the attorneys. In March 1999, Caltrans agreed to delay the construction for several years to evaluate the environmental impact. During the early 2000s, the interchange with SR 125 was reconstructed to allow for the extension of the latter freeway south to SR 54, which was finished in 2003.

In late 2006, the Jamul Indian tribe prepared to construct a casino, but many expressed concerns about the amount of traffic that would now travel on SR 94. In 2007, Caltrans declared that the construction required a permit to connect to SR 94 and to construct on the state right-of-way. At the end of the year, the tribe had started construction on the driveway to the casino, while Caltrans stated that it lacked the information needed to determine if the proposed traffic signal should be approved. In late 2009, the tribe filed a lawsuit against Caltrans over the inability to get approval to connect the driveway with the highway. The tribe made the claim that they were a sovereign nation and did not need the approval, but this was rejected by the court. Caltrans and the tribe came to an agreement in 2009, where the tribe would provide its own studies and pay for environmental mitigation.

== Future ==
Caltrans has plans to add a ramp from southbound SR 125 to SR 94 to improve the interchange; it is in the environmental planning stages, and is estimated to cost $71 million. Also in the planning stages are high-occupancy toll lanes between the I-5 and I-805 interchanges, and rerouting part of SR 94 east of the junction with Jamacha Boulevard while improving some interchanges.

== Major intersections ==
Except where prefixed with a letter, postmiles were measured on the road as it was in 1964, based on the alignment that existed at the time, and do not necessarily reflect current mileage. Postmile prefixes include: R reflecting a realignment in the route since then, M indicating a second realignment, L referring to an overlap due to a correction or change, and T indicating postmiles classified as temporary. Segments that remain unconstructed or have been relinquished to local control may be omitted. The entire route is in San Diego County.

Location	Postmile	Exit	Destinations	Notes
San Diego	1.42	–	F street to I-5 south – Balboa Park, Downtown, Petco Park	Continues as F street beyond I-5 north; west end of SR 94; eastbound entrance accessible from G Street
San Diego	1.42	1A	I-5 north – Los Angeles	Westbound exit and eastbound entrance; I-5 exit 15B
San Diego	1.85	1B	25th Street	Westbound exit and eastbound entrance
San Diego	2.21	1C	28th Street	Signed as exit 1 eastbound
San Diego	2.68	1D	32nd Street / Broadway	No eastbound exit
San Diego	3.17	2A-C	SR 15	Signed as exits 2A (south) and 2C (north) eastbound; westbound exit to SR 15 north is via exit 3; SR 15 north exits 2B-C, south exit 2 to SR 94 west; former SR 103; future I-15
San Diego	3.62	2B	Home Avenue	Eastbound exit and westbound entrance
San Diego	4.09	3	I-805	Eastbound exit to I-805 north is via exit 2C; I-805 exits 13A-14
San Diego	4.63	–	47th Street	Entrance ramps only
San Diego	5.14	4A	Euclid Avenue	Signed as exit 4 westbound
San Diego	5.79	4B	Kelton Road, Federal Boulevard (west)	Federal Boulevard not signed eastbound; signed as exit 5 westbound
San Diego	6.16	5	Federal Boulevard (east)	Eastbound exit and northbound entrance
San Diego	7.29	6A	College Grove Way	Westbound exit and entrance
Lemon Grove	7.76	6B	College Avenue / Broadway	Signed as exit 6 eastbound; no eastbound entrance
Lemon Grove	8.27	7	Massachusetts Avenue	
Lemon Grove	8.93	8	Lemon Grove Avenue	
Lemon Grove–La Mesa line	T10.11	9	SR 125	Signed as exits 9A (south) and 9B (north); SR 125 exit 15, south exit 16 to SR 94 east; SR 125 north of SR 94 was formerly SR 67
La Mesa	R10.88	9C	Spring Street – La Mesa	
Spring Valley	R11.08	10A	Bancroft Drive	
Spring Valley	R11.80	10B	Kenwood Drive – Casa de Oro	
Spring Valley	R12.75	11	Sweetwater Springs Boulevard – Casa de Oro	
Spring Valley	R13.33	12	Avocado Boulevard / Calavo Drive	
Spring Valley		East end of freeway		
	14.33		CR S17 (Jamacha Boulevard)	
	14.86		SR 54 east (Jamacha Road)	
	24.57		Otay Lakes Road – Otay Lakes, Chula Vista, National City	
	38.97		SR 188 south – Tecate	
	52.15		CR S1 north (Buckman Springs Road)	
	64.23		Old Highway 80 – Live Oak Springs, San Diego	Former US 80 west
Boulevard	64.82		Old Highway 80 – Jacumba	Former US 80 east
	65.38		I-8 – El Centro, San Diego	Interchange; I-8 exit 65; east end of SR 94
	65.38		Ribbonwood Road	Continuation beyond I-8
1.000 mi = 1.609 km; 1.000 km = 0.621 mi: Incomplete access
