= California State Route 188 =

Highway in California

State Route 188
- Tecate Road
- State Route 188 highlighted in red

Route information
- Maintained by Caltrans
- Length: 1.850 mi (2.977 km)
- Existed: 1972–present

Major junctions
- South end: Avenida Lázaro Cárdenas at the Mexican border in Tecate
- North end: SR 94 near Potrero

Location
- Country: United States
- State: California
- Counties: San Diego

Highway system
- State highways in California; Interstate; US; State; Scenic; History; Pre‑1964; Unconstructed; Deleted; Freeways
← SR 187	→ SR 189

State Route 188 (SR 188), also known as Tecate Road, is an about two-mile (3 km) state highway in the U.S. state of California that connects State Route 94 in San Diego County with the Mexico – United States border. Its southern terminus is at the border near Tecate, Baja California and its northern terminus with SR 94 is near Tecate, California. The route was assigned in the area in 1972, and has remained intact since.

== Route description ==
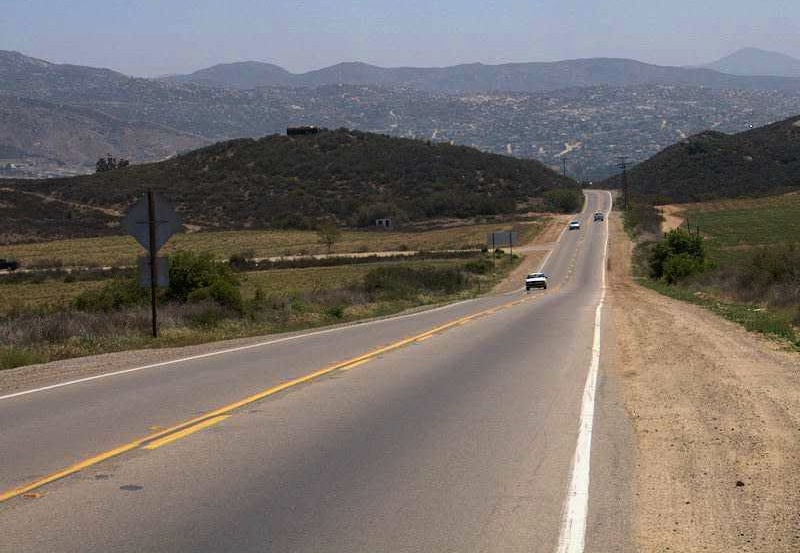
SR 188, with Tecate in the background

Route 188 is defined in section 488 of the California Streets and Highways Code, and that the highway is "from the international boundary near Tecate to Route 94".

SR 188, also known as Tecate Road, begins at the U.S.–Mexico border in the community of Tecate, Baja California; this border crossing handled roughly four percent of all traffic in between Baja California and California during 2008. The route progresses northward, passing through a large commercial district in Tecate, California. The highway heads to an intersection with Thing Road, where it turns to the northeast and out of the commercial district. The route continues to the northeast, intersecting with Humphries Road, where the surroundings become highly undeveloped. SR 188 continues to an intersection with SR 94 a short distance out of Potrero, where the designation ends and right-of-way merges into SR 94.

The entire route is in the National Highway System, a network of highways that are considered essential to the country's economy, defense, and mobility by the Federal Highway Administration. In 2013, SR 188 had an annual average daily traffic (AADT) of 5,600 at the northern terminus, and 5,900 at the southern terminus, the latter of which was the highest AADT for the highway.

== History ==
The original alignment of SR 188, when routes where first assigned, was designated as Legislative Route 94. In the 1964 state highway renumbering, SR 188 was officially defined as "the south end of Fallen Leaf Lake to Route 89 near Camp Richardson"; this was later removed in 1965.

A road from the town of Potrero to Tecate existed by 1917. The Tecate border crossing originally opened in 1932. In 1938, the San Diego County board of supervisors proposed moving rerouting the road to be shorter and on more level ground, although there was opposition from local residents and businesses who favored the old road. However, the route of the road to Tecate has remained the same since then.

The current routing of SR 188 was assigned in 1972. The route has remained virtually unchanged since. The Tecate border crossing expanded through the opening of the Tecate Commercial Vehicle Enforcement Facility, including truck scales; this was completed in 2008, with past expansions to the crossing having been completed in 2004 and 2005.

== Future ==
Improvements are being planned to connect the two ports of entry with a truck bypass to improve security; these are scheduled for completion by 2015.

== Major intersections ==
The entire route is in San Diego County.

Location	mi	km	Destinations	Notes
Tecate	0.00	0.00	Mexico–United States border (Tecate Port of Entry)	South end of SR 188; continues south beyond the international border as Avenida Lázaro Cárdenas
	1.85	2.98	SR 94 – San Diego, El Centro	North end of SR 188
1.000 mi = 1.609 km; 1.000 km = 0.621 mi
