= Daniel Reveles =

American fiction writer

Daniel Reveles is an American fiction writer who lives on the outskirts of Tecate, Baja California, Mexico. He was born in Los Angeles to Mexican parents, where he worked as a radio DJ and television writer, director, and producer for many years. In 1977 he retired to Tecate.

Reveles is known for his stories about Tecate, collected in Enchiladas, Rice and Beans (1994), Tequila, Lemon and Salt (2005), and Guacamole Dip (2008). He received the 2004 Theodor S. Geisel Award from the San Diego Book Awards Association for Tequila, Lemon and Salt.
