= CBTIS (high school) =

Chain of Mexican high schools

CBTIS (Centro de Bachillerato Tecnologico Industrial y de Servicios, Spanish: Industrial and services Technological Baccalaureate Center) is a chain of Mexican high schools (known in Mexico as preparatorias) which offers programs to upgrade the regular degree to a technical-professional level. CBTIS has campuses located in 31 states.

All CBTIS jointly with all CETIS high schools are part of the technical school of the DGETI, and are dependent of Secretaría de Educación Pública of Mexico.

== Location ==
There are 262 CBTIS in Mexico.

| State | No. | Schools |
|---|---|---|
| Aguascalientes | 3 | 39, 168, 195, 282 284 |
| Baja California | 7 | 21, 41, 116, 140, 146, 155, 237 |
| Baja California Sur | 4 | 62, 69, 230, 256 |
| Campeche | 2 | 9, 126 |
| Chiapas | 8 | 88, 92, 108, 144, 169, 170, 233, 243 |
| Chihuahua | 13 | 114, 117, 122, 128, 138, 143, 158, 197, 228, 266, 269, 270, 273 |
| Coahuila | 10 | 20, 34, 36, 54, 97, 127, 156, 196, 235, 239 |
| Colima | 2 | 19, 157 |
| Durango | 11 | 4, 42, 58, 89, 96, 109, 110, 112, 115, 130, 159 |
| Guanajuato | 15 | 60,65, 75, 139, 147, 148, 171, 172, 173, 174, 198, 217, 225, 238, 255 |
| Guerrero | 10 | 14, 56, 57, 82, 134, 175, 176, 177, 178, 216 |
| Hidalgo | 9 | 5, 8, 59, 83, 179, 199, 200, 218, 222 |
| Jalisco | 13 | 10, 38, 49, 68, 70, 201, 226, 244, 245,246, 247, 262, 274 |
| Estado de México | 10 | 6, 29, 50, 133, 160, 161, 180, 202, 203, 227 |
| Michoacán | 10 | 12, 18, 52, 84, 94, 149, 162, 181, 182, 204 |
| Morelos | 6 | 76, 136, 166, 194, 223, 232 |
| Nayarit | 2 | 27, 100 |
| Nuevo León | 5 | 22, 53, 74, 99, 258 |
| Oaxaca | 18 | 2, 25, 26, 31, 90, 91, 107, 123, 150, 183, 205, 231, 240, 248, 259, 263, 264, 265 |
| Puebla | 12 | 16, 44, 86, 104, 184, 229, 241, 242, 252, 254, 257, 260 |
| Querétaro de Arteaga | 2 | 118, 145 |
| Quintana Roo | 6 | 28, 72, 111, 214, 253, 272 |
| San Luis Potosí | 8 | 46, 87, 121, 131, 151, 185, 186, 187 |
| Sinaloa | 5 | 43, 45, 51, 152, 224 |
| Sonora | 13 | 11, 33, 37, 40, 63, 64, 81, 106, 129, 132, 188, 206, 207 |
| Tabasco | 5 | 32, 93, 163, 167, 249 |
| Tamaulipas | 21 | 7, 15, 24, 73, 78, 98, 103, 105, 119, 125, 135, 137, 164, 189, 208, 209, 210, 219, 220, 234, 236, 271 |
| Tlaxcala | 6 | 3, 61, 153, 154, 211, 212 |
| Veracruz | 29 | 13, 17, 30, 35, 47, 48, 55, 66, 67, 71, 77, 78, 79, 85, 101, 102, 113, 124, 142, 165, 190, 191, 192, 213, 250, 251, 261, 267, 268 |
| Yucatán | 4 | 80, 95, 120, 193 |
| Zacatecas | 5 | 1, 23, 141, 215, 221 |

== See also ==
- PREFECO (Preparatoria Federal por Cooperación)
- PFLC (Preparatoria Federal Lázaro Cárdenas)
- CEB (Centro de Estudios de Bachillerato)
- CETis (Centro de Estudios Tecnológicos Industrial y de Servicios)
- CBTA (Centro de Bachillerato Tecnológico Agropecuario)
- CBTF (Centro de Bachillerato Tecnológico Forestal)
- CETMAR (Centro de Estudios Tecnológicos del Mar)
- CETAC (Centro de Estudios Tecnológicos en Aguas Continentales)
