= CBTIS 11 =

Coordinates: 29.1150°N 110.9522°W

Centro de Bachillerato Tecnológico Industrial y de Servicios #11
- Hermosillo, Sonora; Mexico

Information
- Type: High school
- Established: 1963
- Colors: White, cherry, black
- Website: www.dgeti.sep.gob.mx

CBTIS 11, acronym of Centro de Bachillerato Tecnológico Industrial y de Servicios 11, is a preparatoria or high school located in Hermosillo, Sonora, Mexico. It is part of the CBTIS chain of schools organized by the Dirección General de Educación Tecnológica Industrial of the Secretariat of Public Education.
