= Escuela Preparatoria Federal Lázaro Cárdenas =

- Tijuana, Baja California; Mexico

Information
- Established: 1946; 80 years ago
- Website: https://www.lazarocardenas.edu.mx/

Preparatoria Federal "Lázaro Cárdenas" (PFLC) is a federal high school located in Tijuana, north-west Mexico.

Its official mascot is the jaguar and its artistics and culturals teams are called "Jaguares" or "Jags"

== History ==
With the city of Tijuana already undergoing fast development, especially as a strategically located border town between the U.S. and México back in the middle of the 1900s, the need for higher education for its fast growing population soon became imminent; the need to offer post-secondary studies spurred the creation of the first high school ('Preparatoria' as it is called in México) in the region, this at a time when Baja California was still considered as a territory (and therefore highly dependent upon the federal government regarding its governance and administration), before becoming a proper 'State' of Mexico. In 1946 a group of nine students started their studies in an education center that now caters about 5,000 students.

== Origins ==
The school was founded based on Federal Cooperation on September 2, 1946, on the premises of the Alvaro Obregón School, situated at the southwest hillside part of Tijuana, which is now the site of The House of Culture, by its founder, Professor Rosas Garcia Jose Efrain, named as the first director of the federal high school in operation there. In 1950, he moved together with the Secondary Studies section to the Centro Escolar de Agua Caliente to merge this with the Industrial Technical Institute on the same site. The educational complex was initiated by a group of local teachers and professionals led by Professor Rosas Garcia Jose Efrain. Teachers pioneered by Rosas Garcia Jose Efrain, and Angel Morales Barraza, Angel Ruiz Ojeda, Alfonso Gómez Pereira, Gabriel Moreno Lozano, Maximum Argout, Luis Torres Coto, Margarita Ruiz Diaz, Ildefonso Corella and Tiburcio Gómez Alatorre . Subsequently, joined by others like Miguel Bargalló Ardévosol, Maria Luisa Bargalló, Guillermo Caballero Sosa, Julio Torres Coto, Froylan Esparza, Jose Alberich, Aurelio Magro, Antonio Blanco and González Atenogenes.

=== 1960s ===
In 1960 the High School joined the Universidad Autónoma de Baja California (UABC), thus giving birth to the University being implemented in the Coastal Zone, without losing its dependence from the Secretaría de Educación Pública (SEP). In 1961 a divergent movement arose that resulted in the first semester of a school year ending in June, resuming activities with a second semester starting in September, later in the same calendar year..

=== 1970s ===
In 1971 the school adopted the name 'Lázaro Cárdenas', after the former Mexican president famous for, amongst other measures, the nationalization of the oil industry and largely improving and expanding education throughout the country, who had died on October 19, 1970.

In 1972 major changes set educational standards such as:

- Plan of study of 6 semesters
- Morning schedule of classes
- Pioneering the specialized skills programs in ten different professional areas.

==== Federalization decree ====
'Sure, from this moment this is a federalized High School!' was the response given by the President of Mexico, Luis Echeverria Alvarez, to the pledge posed to him with a blanket by a large crowd of students on the night of December 2, 1973, at the school's 'Salvador Allende' Civic Plaza.

With the arrival of Professor Jesús Ruiz Barraza, a series of measures were taken which transformed the school from a small provincial one to a large high school. In 1972, within the context of educational reform set forth by president Echeverria's government, the school was incorporated into the 'National Association of Universities and Institutions of Higher Education' classification (ANUIES), abandoning the two-year plan in use since 1946, and supplying a three-year high school education program providing real job training in various professional specialties.

Before 1972, classes were only held in the evening in limited-space premises known as High School 19. Due to the constantly growing demand of students seeking high school education, Barraza pointed to the need to hold classes during the morning hours. With limited resources additional classrooms were built, allowing enrollment to increase to just over 1,000 secondary education students. President Echeverría granted the request and, in May 1972, a group of students invited the president, while visiting the city, to see the school's facilities. Students and campus leaders were asking for laboratories, classrooms and sports fields and, most importantly the federalization of the school; President Echeverria fulfilled the request, and awarded two million pesos for the construction of an all-new building. From then onwards the school ceased to be funded by its students, and joined the federation.

During another visit to Tijuana on 2 December 1973, President Echeverria inaugurated the new facilities and publicly declared the official federalization of the school.

From that point, the school became a member institution of the Federal Education System thus receiving federal financial funding for its operations, staff, maintenance and expansion of facilities. The school's graduates have a statistically higher than average performance record in Tijuana and the state of Baja California, and Mexico, in general.

=== 1980s ===
The school began offering adult, night school classes in 1983.

== Headmasters ==
- Melesio Rosales Gómez (1946–1949)
- Capacete Manuel Marín (1949–1956)
- Jesus Cortes Limón (1959–1969)
- Pedrote José García (1969–1970)
- Guillermo Prado Prado (1971-1971)
- Jesus J. Ruiz Barraza (1971–1984)
- David Anguiano Heredia (1984–1988)
- Victor Flores Orozco (1988–1992)
- Mario Ortiz Villacorta (1992–1995)
- José Cruz Holguín Ruiz (1995–2012)
- Martín Moreno Félix (2012–2016)
- José Cruz Holguín Ruiz (2016–2021), second term
- Carlos Abel Eslava Carrillo (2021-2025)
- Catalina Heredia Cardiel (2025-2026)
- Mario Ricardo Zumaya Parra (2026- present)

== General Baccalaureate ==
The study program meets the requirements specified by the Secretary of Higher Secondary Education (SEMS), that regulates the Secretaria de Educación Pública (SEP]. These are spread in six semesters in which from the third one the student has access to undertake one of the ten specializing courses according to eleven different professional areas that the campus offers. These are:

- Clinical Analysis
- Dental Mechanics
- Architectural Drawing and Construction
- Electronics
- Computer Science
- Accounting
- Customs and import/export
- Administration
- Communication
- Social Worker
- Graphic Design

== International Baccalaureate ==
Authorized to offer the IB Diploma Programme since November 1982, the program is taught in Spanish. But students are also required to master the English language, on an 80% minimum ratio. Students usually enroll for IB examinations in May. The International Baccalaureate (IB) aims to develop caring, informed and eager for knowledge students, who help to create a better and more peaceful world in the context of mutual understanding and intercultural respect.

In pursuit of this objective, the organization works with schools, governments and international organizations to develop challenging programs of international education and demanding rigorous assessment. These programs encourage students across the world to adopt an active attitude of lifelong learning, to be compassionate and understand that other people, with their differences, can also be right. The main objective of the IB program is to train internationally minded people, aware of the condition that unites human beings and the shared responsibility to ensure the planet, help to create a better and more peaceful world.

In the last call, students enrolled in the following subjects: Biology SL English B HL, History HL, ITSG SL, Math Studies SL, Math SL Physics SL Spanish A1 HL and Theory of Knowledge TK.

== Civic and cultural activities ==
This department has existed since 1972, so the civic and cultural activities are born with the high school and have been strengthened and defined through the years.

The objectives of these clubs are stated as it follows on the school manual: "Promotion and protection of the cultural, regional and national values"

Every Monday one of these clubs will do an artistic performance on the assembly of the school, the order of the clubs that will do it is already scheduled on a civic calendar made by the school direction.

Available clubs:

- Batucada
- Folk Dance
- Street Dance
- Marching Band
- Irish Dance
- Jazz Dance
- Ballet
- Latin American Music
- Classical Guitar
- Plastic Arts
- Photography
- Theater
- Arabic Dance
- Polynesian Dance
- Popular Music

This list is based on the 2019-2020 school manual published on the official page of the PFLC.

(The list of clubs can change every year)

== Sports activities ==
All the sports teams on the next list are available for the students to participate if they meet the necessary requirements on the selection phase which is held at the start of a new semester.

- Softball
- Chess
- Basketball
- Indoor Soccer
- Taekwondo
- Athletics
- Baseball
- Handball
- Cheerleading
- Flag Football
- Soccer
- Volleyball
- Swimming
- Tennis

This list is based on the 2019-2020 school manual published on the official page of the PFLC.

(The list of activities can change every year)
