= Tecate Port of Entry =

Border crossing between Mexico and the U.S.

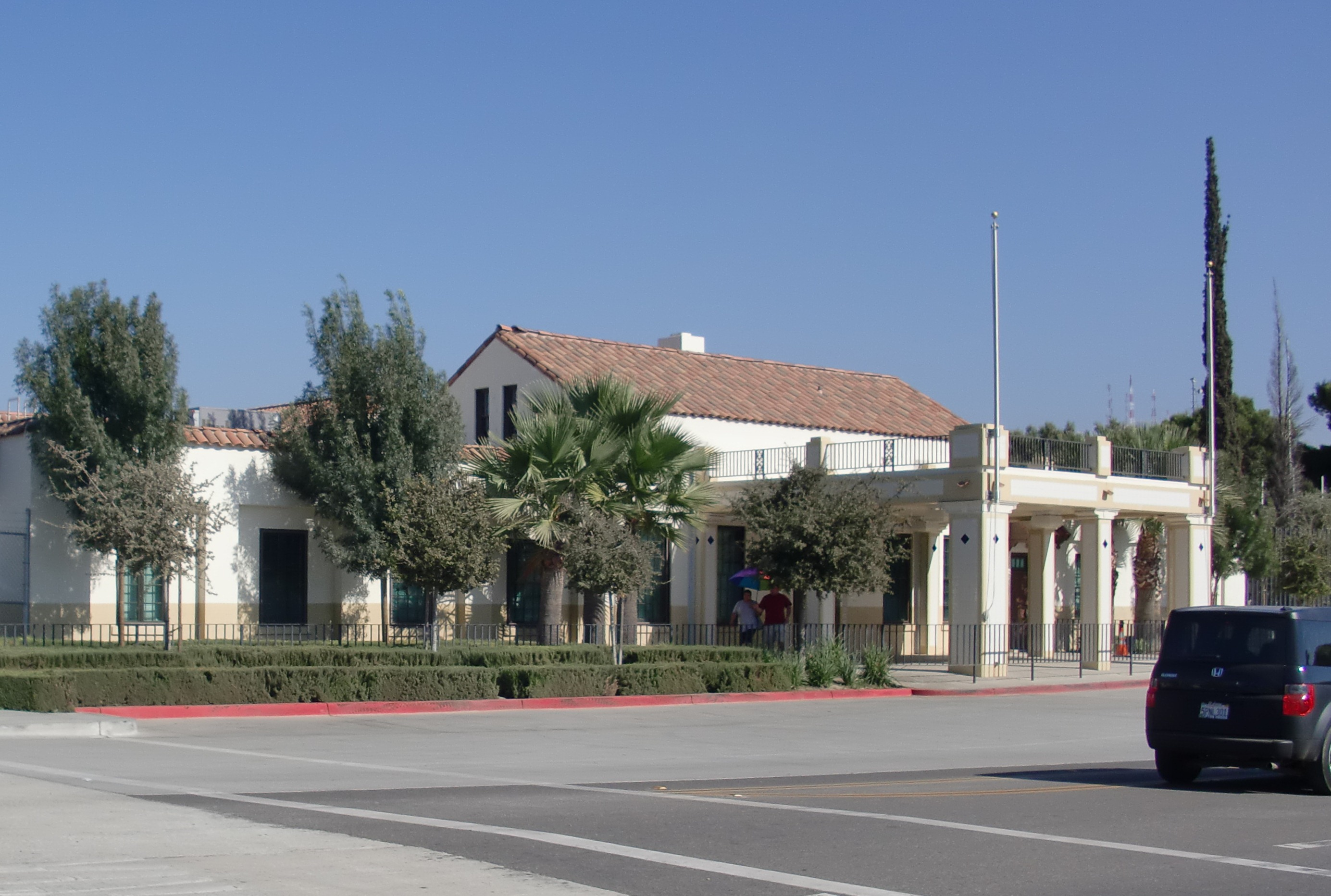
- Tecate Border Inspection Station

Location
- Country: United States
- Location: 405 Tecate Road, Tecate, California 91980
- Coordinates: 32.576852°N 116.627179°W

Details
- Opened: 1919

Statistics
- 2011 Cars: 1,571,780
- 2011 Trucks: 51,930
- Pedestrians: 525,312

Website
- https://www.cbp.gov/contact/ports/tecate-class-california-2505
- US Inspection Station-Tecate
- U.S. National Register of Historic Places
- NRHP reference No.: 91001748
- Added to NRHP: February 14, 1992

The Tecate Port of Entry is one of three ports of entry in the San Diego–Tijuana metropolitan region. The land port is located between Tecate, California, in San Diego County's Mountain Empire and Tecate Municipality in Baja California. It connects California State Route 188 with Paseo Lázaro Cárdenas, a spur of Mexican Federal Highway 2, as well as Federal Highway 3 to the south. It is a minor port in comparison to the larger San Ysidro Port of Entry and the Otay Mesa Port of Entry. This is attributed in part to the fact that reaching the crossing on the US side requires driving on narrow, winding mountain roads.

== History ==
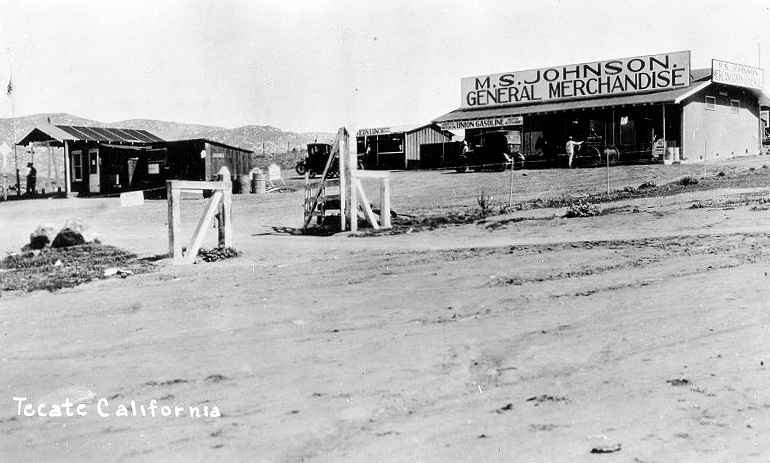
Tecate border crossing as seen from Mexico in 1919. US Customs building is on the left

The original port of entry was established sometime prior to 1919 to inspect the traffic traveling from Tecate, Baja California, in large part to shop at the Thing Brothers store (later the Johnson store) on the US side of the border. The current historic border inspection station (where pedestrians continue to be inspected) was built in 1933; this building was listed on the U.S. National Register of Historic Places in 1992. In 2005 the port was re-opened as an expansion project was completed. Vehicular traffic is now inspected in a new facility attached to the rear of the historic port. The expanded port cost US$18 million and had approximately five times as much space as the original 1933 facility.

== See also ==
- List of Mexico–United States border crossings
