= CEB (high school) =

Chain of Mexican high schools

CEB (or Centro de Estudios de Bachillerato) is a chain of Mexican high schools (known in Mexico as preparatorias) which offers programs to upgrade the regular degree to a technical-professional level. It has campuses located in 21 states and in the Federal District.

All CEBs along with all PFLC and PREFECO high schools are part of the technical school of the Dirección General de Bachillerato (DGB), and are dependents of Secretaría de Educación Pública of Mexico.

== Location ==
There are 34 CEBs in México:

State	No.	Schools
Aguascalientes	2	5/1, 6/1
Baja California Sur	1	5/2
Campeche	1	6/2
Chiapas	1	6/3
Chihuahua	2	6/4, 7/1
Distrito Federal	2	4/1, 4/2
Durango	1	6/5
Guerrero	3	5/3, 6/6, 7/2
Hidalgo	2	5/4, 6/7
Jalisco	2	5/5, 6/8
Estado de México	1	6/9
Michoacán	2	5/6, 6/10
Morelos	1	6/11
Oaxaca	3	5/7, 5/8, 6/12
Puebla	1	6/13
Quintana Roo	2	5/9, 5/10
San Luis Potosí	1	5/11
Sonora	2	5/12, 6/14
Tamaulipas	1	6/15
Tlaxcala	1	6/16
Veracruz	1	5/13
Zacatecas	1	6/17

== See also ==
- CBTA (Centro de Bachillerato Tecnológico Agropecuario)
- CBTF (Centro de Bachillerato Tecnológico Forestal)
- CBTIS (Centro de Bachillerato Tecnológico Industrial y de Servicios)
- CETAC (Centro de Estudios Tecnológicos en Aguas Continentales)
- CETIS (Centro de Estudios Tecnológicos Industrial y de Servicios)
- CETMAR (Centro de Estudios Tecnológicos del Mar)
- PFLC (Preparatoria Federal Lázaro Cárdenas)
- PREFECO (Preparatoria Federal por Cooperación)
