= CETAC (high school) =

Chain of Mexican high schools

Centro de Estudios Tecnológicos en Aguas Continentales (CETAC) is a chain of Mexican high schools (known in Mexico as preparatorias) which offers programs to upgrade the regular degree to a technical-professional level. CETAC has campuses in two states.

All CETAC and CETMAR high schools are part of the technical school of the Educación en Ciencia y Tecnología del Mar (DGECyTM) and are dependents of Secretaría de Educación Pública.

== Location ==
There are two CETAC in México

State	No.	Schools
Hidalgo	1	2
Jalisco	1	1

== See also ==
- CBTA (Centro de Bachillerato Tecnológico Agropecuario)
- CBTF (Centro de Bachillerato Tecnológico Forestal)
- CBTIS (Centro de Bachillerato Tecnológico Industrial y de Servicios)
- CEB (Centro de Estudios de Bachillerato)
- CETIS (Centro de Estudios Tecnológicos Industrial y de Servicios)
- CETMAR (Centro de Estudios Tecnológicos del Mar)
- PFLC (Preparatoria Federal Lázaro Cárdenas)
- PREFECO (Preparatoria Federal por Cooperación)
