= Casa de Oro-Mount Helix, California =

Casa de Oro-Mount Helix
- Census designated place
- Interactive map of Casa de Oro-Mount Helix
- Location in the United States
- Coordinates: 32°45′48″N 116°58′39″W
- Country: United States
- State: California
- County: San Diego

Area
  - Total: 6.85 sq mi (17.74 km^{2})
  - Land: 6.85 sq mi (17.74 km^{2})
  - Water: 0 sq mi (0.00 km^{2}) 0%

Population (2020)
  - Total: 19,576
  - Density: 2,857.4/sq mi (1,103.25/km^{2})
- Time zone: UTC-8 (Pacific)
  - Summer (DST): UTC-7 (PDT)
- ZIP codes: 91941, 91977, 92020
- Area code: 619
- FIPS code: 06-11691
- GNIS feature ID: 2407979

Casa de Oro-Mount Helix is a census-designated place (CDP) in the East County region of San Diego County, California. As of the 2020 census, Casa de Oro-Mount Helix had a population of 19,576.

The CDP encompasses several unincorporated neighborhoods east of La Mesa and south of El Cajon, principally the communities of Mount Helix and Casa de Oro. Much of the area lies within the County of San Diego’s Valle de Oro Community Planning Area, which identifies Casa de Oro, Mount Helix, Vista Grande Hills, and Rancho San Diego as neighborhoods within the planning area."Valle de Oro Community Plan". County of San Diego. Planning & Development Services. County planning documents also refer collectively to the “Mt. Helix/Casa de Oro Area”, with lower-density residential development extending from the Casa de Oro area northward onto the slopes of Mount Helix."Valle de Oro Community Plan" (PDF). County of San Diego. Planning & Development Services.

Mount Helix developed during the early 20th century as a semi-rural residential community characterized by orchards, large homesites, and estate properties. Developer Ed Fletcher acquired Mount Helix and developed it as an exclusive residential community."God's Garden: A History of the Point Loma Theosophical Community". The Journal of San Diego History. San Diego History Center. Fall 1985. The area’s large and irregular hillside lots subsequently attracted custom residential development and contributed to a diverse architectural landscape, including Spanish and Mediterranean Revival, Hacienda and California Ranch, Mid-century Modern, and other custom residential styles. The community is also characterized by winding roads, mature landscaping, prominent rock outcroppings, and low-density residential development."Valle de Oro Community Plan" (PDF). County of San Diego. Planning & Development Services.

Postal addresses within the CDP vary by location, with residents using La Mesa, Spring Valley, and El Cajon mailing addresses. Postal designations do not necessarily correspond to County community-planning boundaries.

== History ==
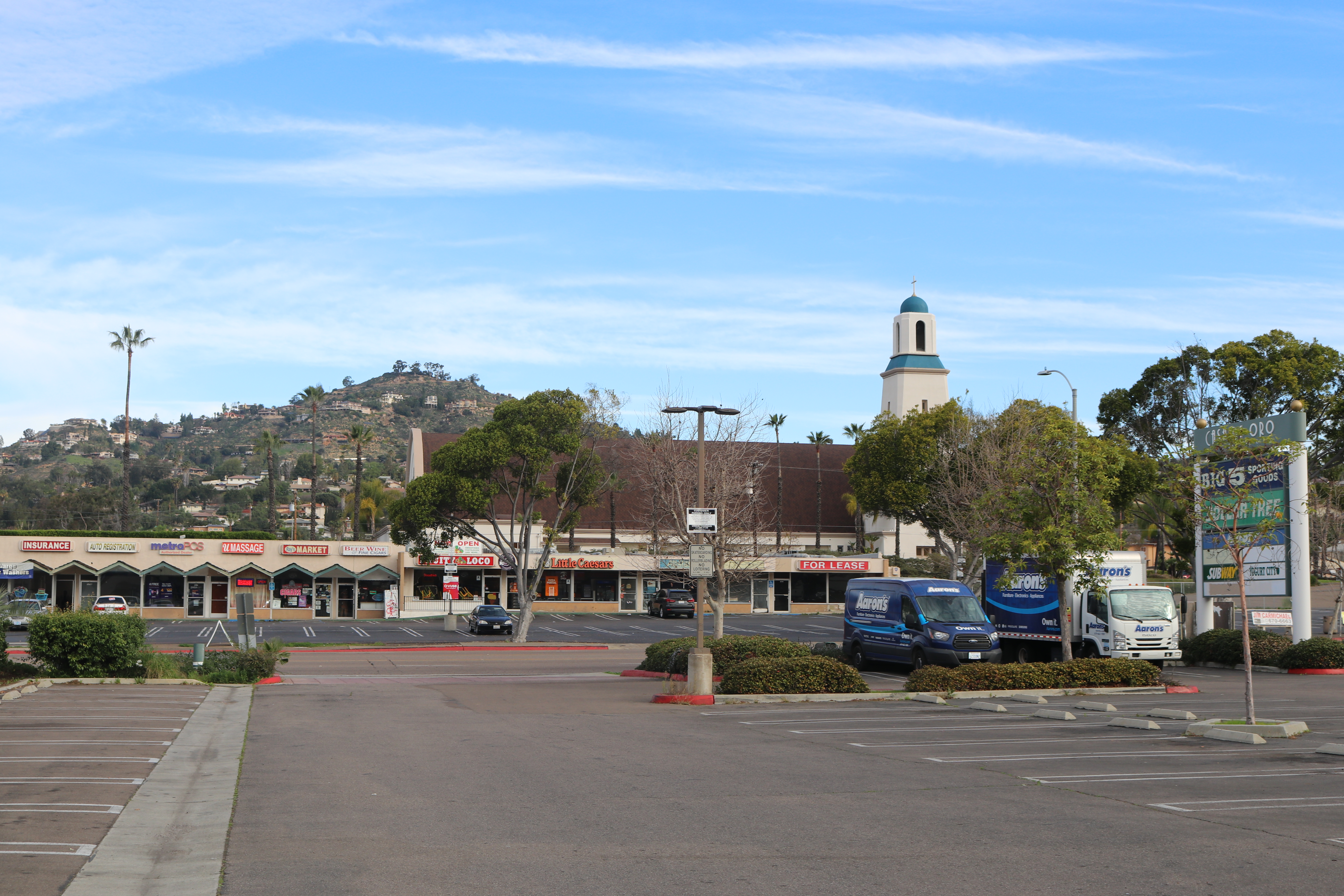
Mount Helix behind the steeple of Santa Sophia Church (inaugurated 1958)

In 1872, after a scientist discovered a European snail (Cornu aspersum, formerly Helix aspersa) living on a small mountain, Rufus King Porter, the founder of what is now unincorporated Spring Valley, California, named the peak Mt. Helix. Then in 1885, the United States Postal Service rejected the use of two words for a post office name, so Rufus submitted just the name Helix and also became the first postmaster in Spring Valley; the Helix Post Office was operated out of his home.

Around this same time, Hubert Howe Bancroft came to the area. He bought the Porters' ranch and also acquired neighboring properties, accumulating about 500 acres (2.0 km^{2}). He began calling his property "Helix Farms." Bancroft hired workers to help develop Helix Farms, planting orchards and building structures for his ranch. By the early 1900s, Helix Farms was home to the largest olive ranch in southern California; some of the original olive trees can still be found today. Bancroft died in 1918, and eventually his family sold the property.

== Geography ==
Casa de Oro-Mount Helix is located at 32°45′48″N 116°58′39″W (32.763359, -116.977474).

According to the United States Census Bureau, the CDP has a total area of 6.9 square miles (18 km^{2}), all land.

== Demographics ==
Historical population
Census	Pop.	Note	%±
1970	8,723		—
1980	19,651		125.3%
1990	30,727		56.4%
2000	18,874		−38.6%
2010	18,762		−0.6%
2020	19,576		4.3%
U.S. Decennial Census; 1860–1870 1880-1890; 1900 1910 1920; 1930 1940 1950; 1960 1970 1980; 1990 2000 2010; 2020; As Grossmont-Mt. Helix in 1970

Casa de Oro-Mount Helix first appeared as an unincorporated place under the name Grossmont-Mt. Helix in the 1970 U.S. census; and then as a census designated place under the name Casa de Oro-Mount Helix in the 1980 United States census.

=== Racial and ethnic composition ===
Casa de Oro-Mount Helix CDP, California – Racial and ethnic composition Note: the US Census treats Hispanic/Latino as an ethnic category. This table excludes Latinos from the racial categories and assigns them to a separate category. Hispanics/Latinos may be of any race.
Race / Ethnicity (NH = Non-Hispanic)	Pop 2000	Pop 2010	Pop 2020	% 2000	% 2010	% 2020
White alone (NH)	14,694	13,061	11,836	77.85%	69.61%	60.46%
Black or African American alone (NH)	930	1,064	1,174	4.93%	5.67%	6.00%
Native American or Alaska Native alone (NH)	75	69	53	0.40%	0.37%	0.27%
Asian alone (NH)	378	566	718	2.00%	3.02%	3.67%
Native Hawaiian or Pacific Islander alone (NH)	50	86	82	0.26%	0.46%	0.42%
Other race alone (NH)	57	27	101	0.30%	0.14%	0.52%
Mixed race or Multiracial (NH)	548	654	1,068	2.90%	3.49%	5.46%
Hispanic or Latino (any race)	2,142	3,235	4,544	11.35%	17.24%	23.21%
Total	18,874	18,762	19,576	100.00%	100.00%	100.00%

=== 2020 census ===
As of the 2020 census, Casa de Oro-Mount Helix had a population of 19,576 and a population density of 2,857.4 inhabitants per square mile (1,103.2/km^{2}). The racial makeup of the CDP was 65.0% White, 6.4% African American, 0.6% Native American, 4.0% Asian, 0.5% Pacific Islander, 8.2% from other races, and 15.3% from two or more races, with Hispanic or Latino residents of any race comprising 23.2% of the population.

Racial composition as of the 2020 census
Race	Number	Percent
White	12,719	65.0%
Black or African American	1,258	6.4%
American Indian and Alaska Native	126	0.6%
Asian	777	4.0%
Native Hawaiian and Other Pacific Islander	98	0.5%
Some other race	1,611	8.2%
Two or more races	2,987	15.3%

The census reported that 99.1% of residents lived in households, 0.5% lived in non-institutionalized group quarters, and 0.4% were institutionalized.

100.0% of residents lived in urban areas, while 0.0% lived in rural areas.

There were 7,108 households, of which 29.2% had children under the age of 18 living in them. Married-couple households made up 57.4% of all households, 5.8% were cohabiting couple households, 22.8% had a female householder with no spouse or partner present, and 14.1% had a male householder with no spouse or partner present. About 18.9% of all households were made up of individuals, and 10.8% had someone living alone who was 65 years of age or older. The average household size was 2.73, and there were 5,339 families (75.1% of households).

The age distribution was 19.7% under the age of 18, 8.1% aged 18 to 24, 21.9% aged 25 to 44, 27.9% aged 45 to 64, and 22.3% who were 65 years of age or older. The median age was 45.2 years. For every 100 females there were 96.5 males, and for every 100 females age 18 and over there were 94.1 males.

There were 7,370 housing units at an average density of 1,075.8 units per square mile (415.4 units/km^{2}), of which 96.4% were occupied. The homeowner vacancy rate was 0.9% and the rental vacancy rate was 4.0%; 72.3% of occupied housing units were owner-occupied and 27.7% were occupied by renters.

=== 2010 census ===
The 2010 United States census reported that Casa de Oro-Mount Helix had a population of 18,762. The population density was 2,737.8 inhabitants per square mile (1,057.1/km^{2}). The racial makeup of Casa de Oro-Mount Helix was 13,375 (64.6%) White, 1,108 (5.9%) African American, 89 (0.5%) Native American, 593 (3.2%) Asian, 96 (0.5%) Pacific Islander, 996 (5.3%) from other races, and 999 (5.3%) from two or more races. Hispanic or Latino of any race were 4,815 persons (23.3%).

The Census reported that 18,563 people (98.9% of the population) lived in households, 110 (0.6%) lived in non-institutionalized group quarters, and 89 (0.5%) were institutionalized.

There were 6,943 households, out of which 2,179 (31.4%) had children under the age of 18 living in them, 4,036 (58.1%) were opposite-sex married couples living together, 745 (10.7%) had a female householder with no husband present, 360 (5.2%) had a male householder with no wife present. There were 365 (5.3%) unmarried opposite-sex partnerships, and 77 (1.1%) same-sex married couples or partnerships. 1,319 households (19.0%) were made up of individuals, and 617 (8.9%) had someone living alone who was 65 years of age or older. The average household size was 2.67. There were 5,141 families (74.0% of all households); the average family size was 3.02.

=== 2023 ACS estimates ===
In 2023, the US Census Bureau estimated that the median household income was $123,037, and the per capita income was $58,567. About 2.5% of families and 4.7% of the population were below the poverty line.

== Education ==
Public high school education is provided by the Grossmont Union High School District. Elementary and middle schools are run by the La Mesa-Spring Valley School District.

== Government ==
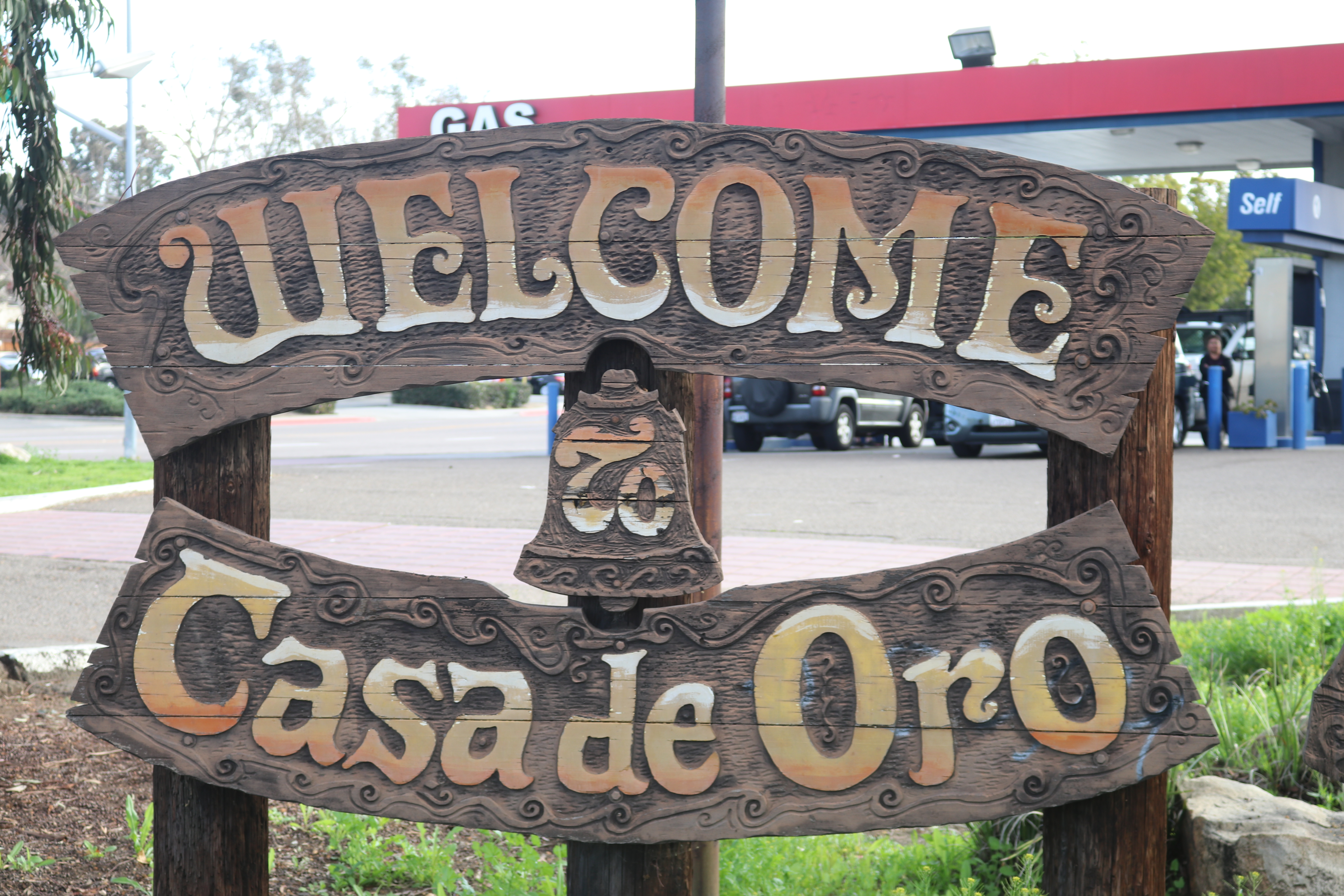
Welcome sign to Casa de Oro, California

In the California State Legislature, Casa de Oro-Mount Helix is in the 39th senatorial district, represented by Democrat Akilah Weber Pierson, and in the 75th Assembly district, represented by Republican Carl DeMaio.
