= CBTF (high school) =

Chain of Mexican high schools

CBTF (Centro de Bachillerato Tecnologico Forestal is a chain of Mexican high schools (known in Mexico as preparatorias) which offers programs to upgrade the regular degree to a technical-professional level. CBTF has campuses in four states.

All CBTF jointly with all CBTA high schools are part of the technical school of the Dirección General de Educación Tecnológica Agropecuaria (DGETA), and are dependent of Secretaría de Educación Pública of Mexico.

== Location ==
There are 6 CBTF in Mexico.

State	No.	Schools
Durango	3	1, 2, 4
Guerrero	1	5
Michoacán	1	6
Oaxaca	1	3

== See also ==
- CBTA (Centro de Bachillerato Tecnológico Agropecuario)
- CBTIS (Centro de Bachillerato Tecnológico Industrial y de Servicios)
- CEB (Centro de Estudios de Bachillerato)
- CETAC (Centro de Estudios Tecnológicos en Aguas Continentales)
- CETIS (Centro de Estudios Tecnológicos Industrial y de Servicios)
- CETMAR (Centro de Estudios Tecnológicos del Mar)
- PFLC (Preparatoria Federal Lázaro Cárdenas)
- PREFECO (Preparatoria Federal por Cooperación)
