= Centro de Bachillerato Tecnologico Agropecuario No. 18 =

Coordinates: 18.3662°N 100.6779°W

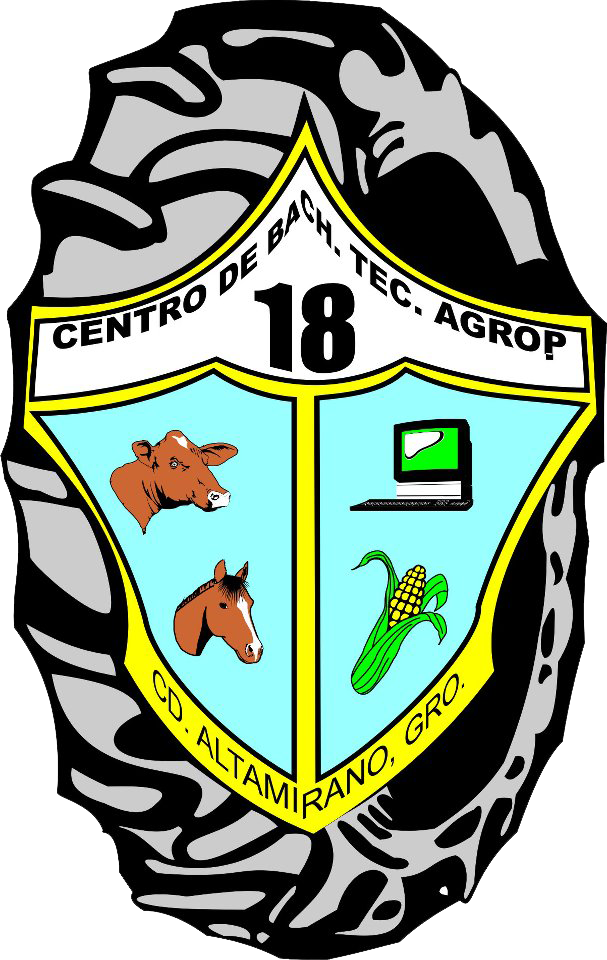
- Official logo

Location
- Av. Francisco I. Madero Poniente 1200; Cd. Altamirano, Guerrero 40660; Mexico

Information
- Type: Public high school
- Motto: None
- Established: October 1, 1973
- School district: SEP
- Principal: Lic. Geovany Mena García
- Colors: Sky blue, navy blue, white
- Mascot: Cow
- Nickname: Cbta 18
- Website: cbta18.galeon.com

The Centro De Bachillerato Tecnologico Agropecuario No. 18, Gral. Cipriano Jaimes Hernandez (commonly called CBTA 18) is an upper-middle level agricultural education institution located in Ciudad Altamirano, Guerrero, Mexico. Founded on 1 October 1973 under the name Centro de Estudios Tecológicos Agropecuarios No. 18 (C.E.T.A 18), it is the first such institution created by the Dirección General de Educación Tecnológica Agropecuaria (D.G.E.T.A) in the state of Guerrero.

== See also ==
- CBTA
