= Preparatoria Federal =

Chain of Mexican high schools

Preparatoria Federal (English: Federal Preparatory) is a chain of Mexican high schools (known in Mexico as preparatorias) which offers programs to upgrade the regular degree to a technical-professional level. Preparatoria Federal has campuses located in 22 states.

The PFLC and all PREFECO jointly with all CEB high schools are part of the technical school of the DGB, and are dependent on the Secretaría de Educación Pública of Mexico.

== PREFECO ==
PREFECO (or Preparatoria Federal por Cooperación English: Cooperation Federal Preparatory) has locations in 22 states.

Began in the year 1938 as an educational project led by President Lázaro Cárdenas. The PREFECO main feature is their support comes from various organizations and federal, state, municipal, and social organizations primarily interested in the educational development of their community.

Some examples of these institutions are: Escuela Preparatoria Federal por Cooperación Melchor Ocampo.

Escuela Preparatoria Federal por Cooperacion Martires de la reforma.

Escuela Preparatoria Federal por cooperacion Lazaro cardenas.

Among others.

== PFLC ==
PFLC or Preparatoria Federal Lázaro Cárdenas (English: Lazaro Cardenas Federal Preparatory School) has a location in the state of Baja California.

Began in October 1946 as a "Cooperation Preparatory". In 1960, the school joins the Autonomous University of Baja California, thus giving rise to the University in the area, without losing its dependence on the SEP. Adopted in 1970 the name "Lazaro Cardenas", and in 1973, was established as a federal school by presidential agreement. Its support is entirely dependent on federal subsidies.

== Locations ==
There are 110 PREFECOs and one PFLC in México.

State	No.	Schools
Aguascalientes	2	52/31, 2/72
Baja California	3	1/1^{1}, 2/1^{1}, 3/1^{1}, 2/43, 2/105
Baja California Sur	8	2/45, 2/56, 2/58, 2/59, 2/61, 2/119, 2/134, 2/172
Campeche	2	2/129, 2/159
Chihuahua	9	2/3, 2/8, 2/15, 2/24, 2/36, 2/47, 2/128, 2/132, 2/150
Coahuila	12	2/5, 2/11, 2/89, 2/101, 2/135, 2/164
Guanajuato	5	2/7, 2/51, 2/71, 2/73, 2/141
Guerrero	5	2/12, 2/21, 2/50, 2/69, 2/104
Hidalgo	15	2/20, 2/23, 2/30, 2/35, 2/46, 2/52, 2/53, 2/54, 2/55, 2/65, 2/70, 2/82, 2/98, 2/175, 2/180
Jalisco	1	2/137
Estado de México	8	2/44, 2/74, 2/88, 2/100, 2/121, 2/142, 2/144, 2/157
Michoacán	9	2/14, 2/16, 2/19, 2/26, 2/34, 2/40, 2/106, 2/140, 2/143
Morelos	10	2/27, 2/42, 2/64, 2/79, 2/84, 2/91, 2/97, 2/123, 2/152, 2/153
Oaxaca	12	2/13, 2/17, 2/37, 2/41, 2/68, 2/85, 2/92, 2/96, 2/108, 2/177, 2/179, 2/181
Puebla	9	2/22, 2/25, 2/28, 2/48, 2/83, 2/103, 2/114, 2/126, 2/138
Sinaloa	3	2/39, 2/49, 2/77
Sonora	4	2/10, 2/33, 2/94, 2/131
Tabasco	1	2/18
Tamaulipas	7	2/1, 2/2, 2/4, 2/6, 2/9, 2/78, 2/110
Tlaxcala	2	2/99, 2/111
Veracruz	12	2/29, 2/38, 2/57, 2/63, 2/86, 2/93, 2/118, 2/127, 2/147, 2/155, 2/156, 2/176
Yucatan	2	2/139, 2/178

1 PFLC Aguacaliente (1/1), PFLC Lomas Virreyes (2/1), PFLC Valle Sur (3/1)

== See also ==
- PREFECO (Preparatoria Federal por Cooperación)
- PFLC (Preparatoria Federal Lázaro Cárdenas)
- CEB (Centro de Estudios de Bachillerato)
- CBTIS (Centro de Bachillerato Tecnológico Industrial y de Servicios)
- CETIS (Centro de Estudios Tecnológicos Industrial y de Servicios)
- CBTA (Centro de Bachillerato Tecnológico Agropecuario)
- CBTF (Centro de Bachillerato Tecnológico Forestal)
- CETMAR (Centro de Estudios Tecnológicos del Mar)
- CETAC (Centro de Estudios Tecnológicos en Aguas Continentales)
