= CETMAR (high school) =

Chain of Mexican high schools

Coordinates: 31.29553°N 113.52202°W

CETMAR (or Centro de Estudios Tecnológicos del Mar) is a chain of Mexican high schools (known in Mexico as preparatorias) which offers programs to upgrade the regular degree to a technical-professional level. CETMAR has campuses located in 16 states.

All CETMAR—jointly with all CETAC high schools—are part of the technical school of the Educación en Ciencia y Tecnología del Mar (DGECyTM), and are dependent of Secretaría de Educación Pública of Mexico.

== Careers ==
The CETMAR offers technical careers is several fields like accountancy, construction, education, cosmetology, tourism, etc. These careers differ in each school.

== Location ==
There are 30 CETMAR in Mexico.

State	No.	Schools
Baja California	1	11
Baja California Sur	4	4, 21, 30, 31
Campeche	2	2, 29
Chiapas	1	24
Colima	1	12
Guerrero	2	18, 27
Michoacán	1	16
Nayarit	2	6, 26
Oaxaca	1	5
Quintana Roo	1	10
Sinaloa	4	8, 13, 23, 28
Sonora	3	3, 14, 22
Tabasco	1	19
Tamaulipas	1	9
Veracruz	4	1, 7, 15, 20
Yucatán	1	17

== See also ==
- CBTA (Centro de Bachillerato Tecnológico Agropecuario)
- CBTF (Centro de Bachillerato Tecnológico Forestal)
- CBTIS (Centro de Bachillerato Tecnológico Industrial y de Servicios)
- CEB (Centro de Estudios de Bachillerato)
- CETAC (Centro de Estudios Tecnológicos en Aguas Continentales)
- CETIS (Centro de Estudios Tecnológicos Industrial y de Servicios)
- PFLC (Preparatoria Federal Lázaro Cárdenas)
- PREFECO (Preparatoria Federal por Cooperación)
