= CBTA (high school) =

Chain of Mexican high schools

CBTA (Centro de Bachillerato Tecnologico Agropecuario is a chain of Mexican high schools (known in Mexico as preparatorias) which offers programs to upgrade the regular degree to a technical-professional level. CBTA has campuses in 31 states.

All CBTA jointly with all CBTF high schools are part of the technical school of the DGETA, and are dependent of Secretaría de Educación Pública of Mexico.

== Location ==
There are 308 CBTAs in Mexico.

State	No.	Schools
Aguascalientes	6	30, 40, 61, 103, 204, 205
Baja California	7	41, 146, 198, 307, 308, 323, 328
Baja California Sur	2	27, 294
Campeche	3	15, 62, 169
Chiapas	11	23, 24, 42, 43, 44, 45, 46, 60, 91, 211, 212
Chihuahua	8	2, 90, 112, 124, 147, 170, 213, 214
Coahuila	8	1, 21, 22, 206, 207, 208, 209, 210
Colima	1	148
Durango	14	3, 28, 47, 63, 64, 101, 104, 149, 171, 172, 173, 215, 216, 217
Guanajuato	9	34, 105, 113, 174, 175, 218, 218, 220, 221
Guerrero	14	18, 65, 66, 102, 125, 151, 176, 177, 178, 191, 222, 223, 224, 225
Hidalgo	8	4, 5, 6, 67, 126, 152, 179, 292
Jalisco	10	19, 31, 32, 106, 127, 226, 227, 228, 229, 230
Estado de México	7	35, 96, 128, 150, 180, 231, 232
Michoacán	20	7, 33, 59, 68, 69, 70, 89, 114, 140, 153, 181, 233, 234, 235, 236, 237, 238, 239, 240, 241
Morelos	8	8, 39, 71, 129, 154, 155, 190, 194
Nayarit	14	72, 107, 108, 130, 156, 182, 195, 242, 243, 244, 245, 246, 247, 248
Nuevo León	10	29, 48, 50, 58, 59, 73, 74, 157, 249, 250
Oaxaca	21	9, 10, 16, 37, 51, 75, 76, 77, 78, 92, 109, 131, 158, 183, 192, 201, 202, 203, 251, 252, 253
Puebla	7	79, 110, 168, 184, 185, 254, 255
Querétaro de Arteaga	2	115, 256
Quintana Roo	3	11, 80, 186
San Luis Potosí	16	52, 119, 120, 121, 122, 123, 141, 142, 143, 159, 160, 187, 196, 257, 258, 259
Sinaloa	6	25, 81, 116, 133, 260, 261
Sonora	10	26, 38, 53, 97, 132, 161, 197, 262, 263, 264
Tabasco	12	54, 82, 93, 94, 95, 144, 199, 200, 265, 266, 267, 268
Tamaulipas	14	12, 55, 56, 83, 98, 117, 139, 269, 270, 271, 272, 273, 274, 275
Tlaxcala	2	134, 162
Veracruz	20	17, 36, 57, 84, 85, 86, 99, 111, 135, 136, 145, 163, 164, 276, 277, 278, 279, 280, 281, 282
Yucatán	8	13, 14, 87, 100, 118, 165, 283, 284
Zacatecas	10	20, 88, 137, 138, 167, 168, 188, 189, 285, 286

== See also ==
- CBTIS (Centro de Bachillerato Tecnológico Industrial y de Servicios)
- CEB (Centro de Estudios de Bachillerato)
- CETAC (Centro de Estudios Tecnológicos en Aguas Continentales)
- CETIS (Centro de Estudios Tecnológicos Industrial y de Servicios)
- CETMAR (Centro de Estudios Tecnológicos del Mar)
- PFLC (Preparatoria Federal Lázaro Cárdenas)
- PREFECO (Preparatoria Federal por Cooperación)
