= La Mesa-Spring Valley School District =

School district in California, United States

Address
- 4750 Date Avenue La Mesa, California, 91942; United States

District information
- Grades: K–8
- Superintendent: David Feliciano
- Schools: 21
- Budget: $145 Million
- NCES District ID: 0620250

Students and staff
- Students: 11,203 (2020–2021)
- Teachers: 438.98 (FTE)
- Staff: 526.06 (FTE)
- Student–teacher ratio: 25.52:1

Other information
- Website: www.lmsvschools.org

La Mesa-Spring Valley School District is a public school district based in the East County area of San Diego County, California, United States. The district serves the city of La Mesa, a portion of the city of El Cajon, the unincorporated communities of Casa de Oro, Mount Helix, and Spring Valley. As of 2021, the district serves 11,400 students in grades K–8. There are four middle schools (grades 7–8) and 17 elementary schools (K–6). The district is run by a five-member elected school board.

== Elementary schools ==
The district's seventeen elementary schools include Avondale, Bancroft Elementary, Casa de Oro Elementary, Fletcher Hills, Highlands, Kempton, La Mesa Dale, La Presa Elementary, Lemon Avenue, Loma, Maryland Avenue, Glenn E. Murdock, Murray Manor, Northmont, Rancho, Rolando, and Sweetwater Springs.

== Middle schools ==
The La Mesa-Spring Valley School District operates four middle schools: La Mesa Arts Academy, Spring Valley Academy, STEAM Academy, and Parkway Middle School.

== Renovations ==
In 2002, the district raised $67 million through school bonds to repair and renovate schools.
