= Manzanita, San Diego County, California =

Unincorporated community in California, United States

Manzanita, California 'Esnyaaw Kutun (Kumiai)
- Unincorporated community
- Location within California Location within the United States
- Coordinates: 32°40′08″N 116°17′23″W
- Country: United States
- State: California
- County: San Diego
- Elevation: 3,507 ft (1,069 m)
- Time zone: UTC-8 (Pacific (PST))
  - Summer (DST): UTC-7 (PDT)
- Area codes: 619 & 858
- GNIS feature ID: 245461

Manzanita (Spanish for "little apple"; Kumiai: 'Esnyaaw Kutun) is an unincorporated community in San Diego County, California, United States. The community is at the junction of Interstate 8 and California State Route 94 17.5 miles (28.2 km) southeast of Pine Valley.
