= CETIS (high school) =

Chain of Mexican high schools

CETIS (Centro de Estudios Tecnológicos Industrial y de Servicios or Industrial Technologies and Services Studies Center) is a form of postsecondary education of Mexican high schools (known in Mexico as preparatorias) which offers programs to upgrade the regular degree to a technical-professional level. CETIS has campuses located in 31 states and the Federal District.

Jointly with the CBTIS, CETIS schools are part of the technical school of the DGETI, and are dependent of SEP.

== Careers ==
The CETIS offers technical careers is several fields like accountancy, electronics, computer science, construction, education, cosmetology, tourism, etc. These careers differ in each school.

== Location ==
There are 168 CETIS in México:

State	No.	Schools
Aguascalientes	2	80, 155
Baja California	6	18, 25, 58, 74, 75, 7, 156
Baja California Sur	1	81
Campeche	2	20, 82
Chiapas	5	85, 136, 137, 138, 158
Chihuahua	6	61, 86, 87, 93, 98, 159
Coahuila	6	24, 46, 48, 59, 60, 83
Colima	2	84, 157
Mexico City	34	1, 2, 3, 4, 5, 6, 7, 8, 9, 10, 11, 12, 13, 29, 30, 31, 32, 39, 42, 49 50, 51, 52, 53, 54, 55, 56, 57, 76, 152, 153, 154, 166, 167
Durango	3	47, 88, 148
Guanajuato	9	21, 62, 77, 89, 115, 139, 149, 150, 160
Guerrero	6	41, 45, 90, 116, 117, 135
Hidalgo	3	26, 91, 140
Jalisco	5	14, 63, 73, 161, 162
Estado de México	15	23, 35, 36, 37, 64, 65, 92, 94, 95, 96, 97, 118, 119, 141, 165
Michoacán	5	27, 28, 34, 120, 121
Morelos	5	12, 43, 44, 99, 122
Nayarit	1	100
Nuevo León	3	66, 101, 163
Oaxaca	6	38, 102, 103, 123, 124, 168
Puebla	4	17, 67, 104, 151
Querétaro de Arteaga	3	16, 105, 142
San Luis Potosí	3	106, 125, 126
Sinaloa	4	68, 107, 108, 127
Sonora	2	69, 128
Tabasco	2	40, 70
Tamaulipas	7	22, 71, 78, 109, 129, 130, 131
Tlaxcala	1	132
Veracruz	12	15, 72, 79, 110, 111, 133, 134, 143, 144, 145, 146, 164
Yucatán	2	19, 112
Zacatecas	3	113, 114, 147

== See also ==
- CBTA (Centro de Bachillerato Tecnológico Agropecuario)
- CBTF (Centro de Bachillerato Tecnológico Forestal)
- CBTIS (Centro de Bachillerato Tecnológico Industrial y de Servicios)
- CEB (Centro de Estudios de Bachillerato)
- CETAC (Centro de Estudios Tecnológicos en Aguas Continentales)
- CETMAR (Centro de Estudios Tecnológicos del Mar)
- PFLC (Preparatoria Federal Lázaro Cárdenas)
- PREFECO (Preparatoria Federal por Cooperación)
