= Casa de Oro, California =

Unincorporated community in California, United States

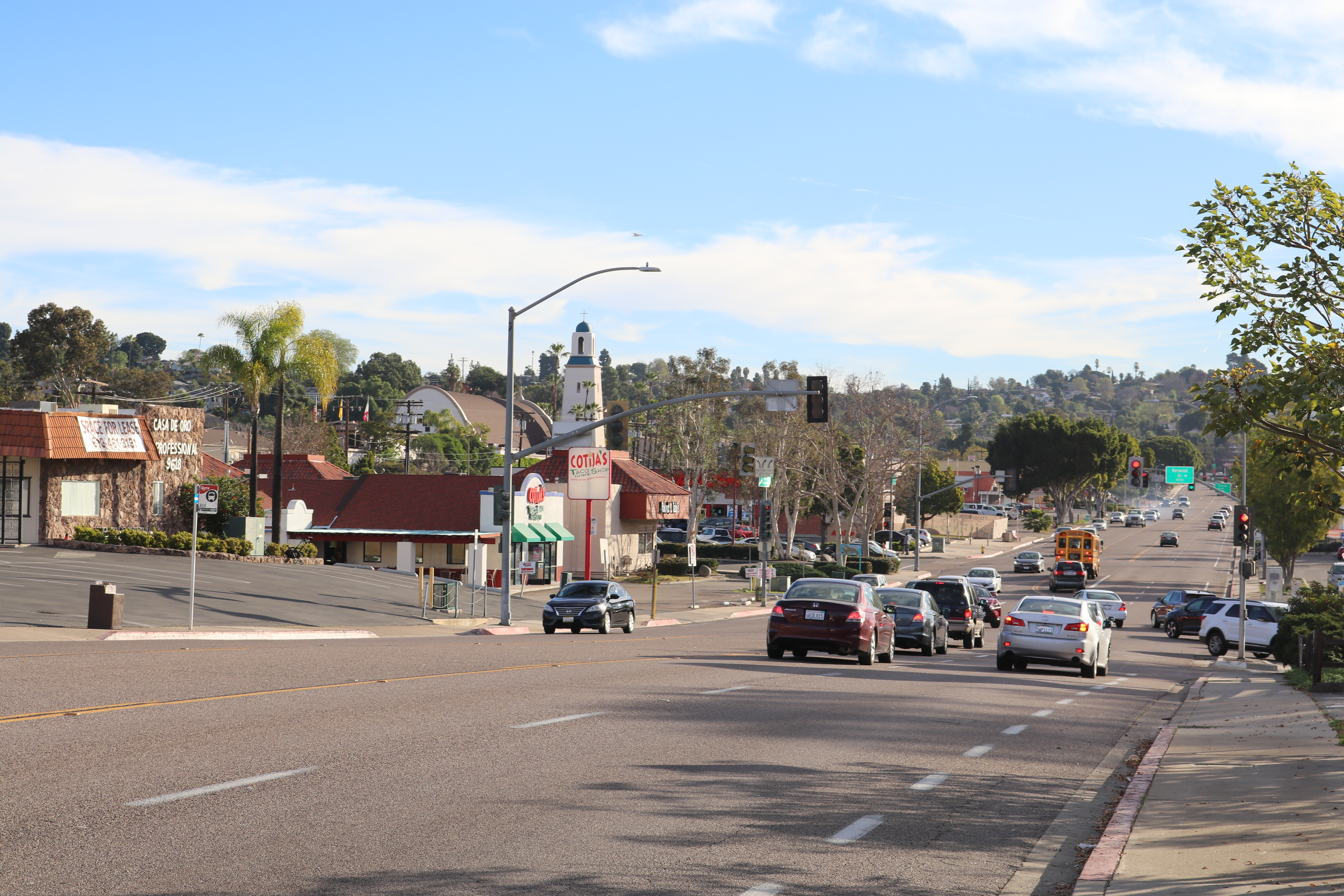
Casa de Oro, Ca looking east on Campo Road with Santa Sophia Church on the left hand side.

Casa de Oro (Spanish for "House of Gold") is a neighborhood in east San Diego County, California, United States. The community, 12 miles east of San Diego, is in the unincorporated town of Spring Valley and an unincorporated part of La Mesa. The United States Census Bureau has also divided the neighborhood between two census-designated places (CDPs), Spring Valley CDP and Casa de Oro-Mount Helix CDP. Casa de Oro's main thoroughfare is Campo Road.

The United States Geological Survey (USGS) places Casa de Oro at 32°44′56″N 116°58′51″W (32.7489409 -116.9808600). Mail sent to Casa de Oro is addressed to Spring Valley, CA or La Mesa, CA, depending on the exact location.
