= Tecate =

City in Baja California, Mexico

- City
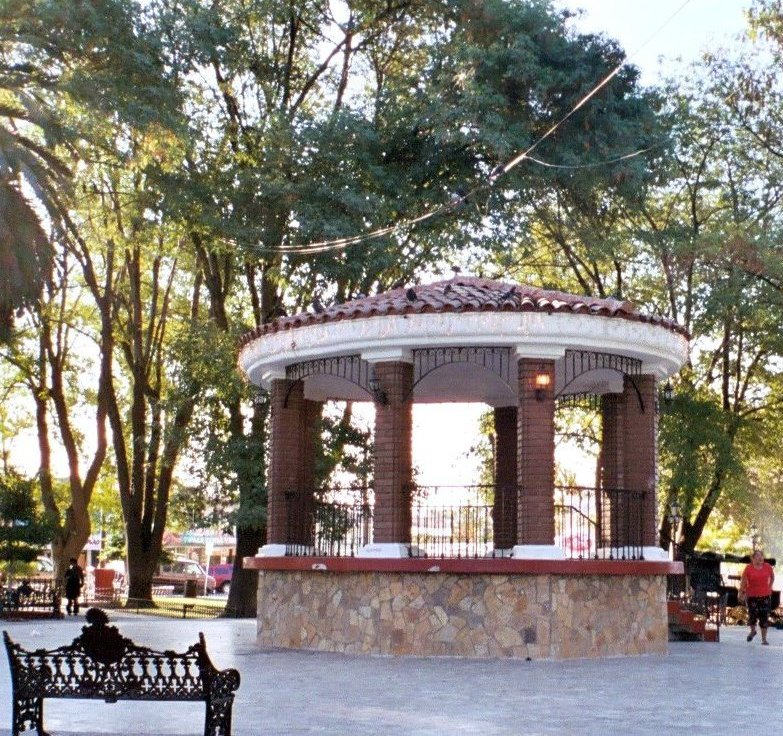
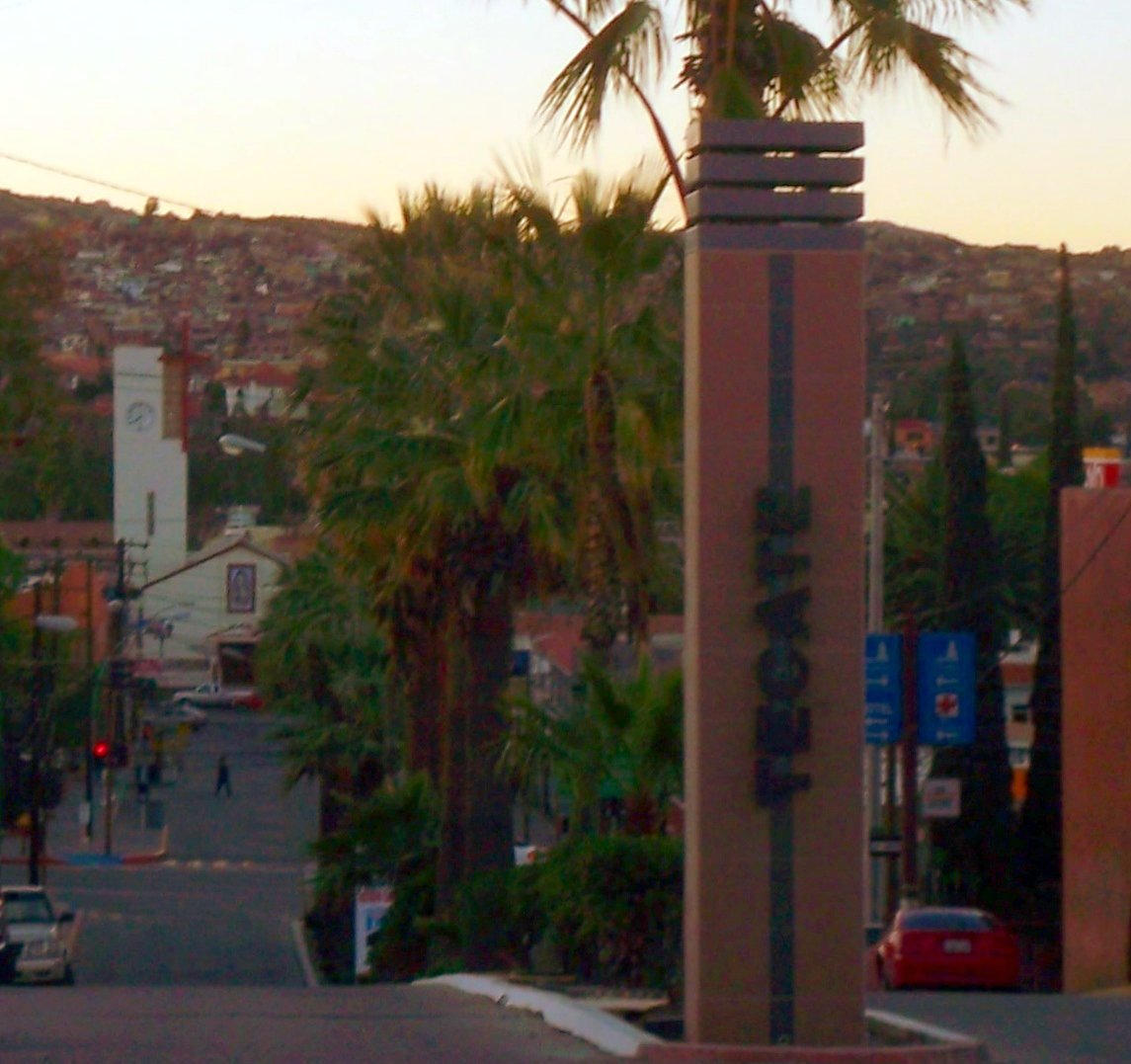
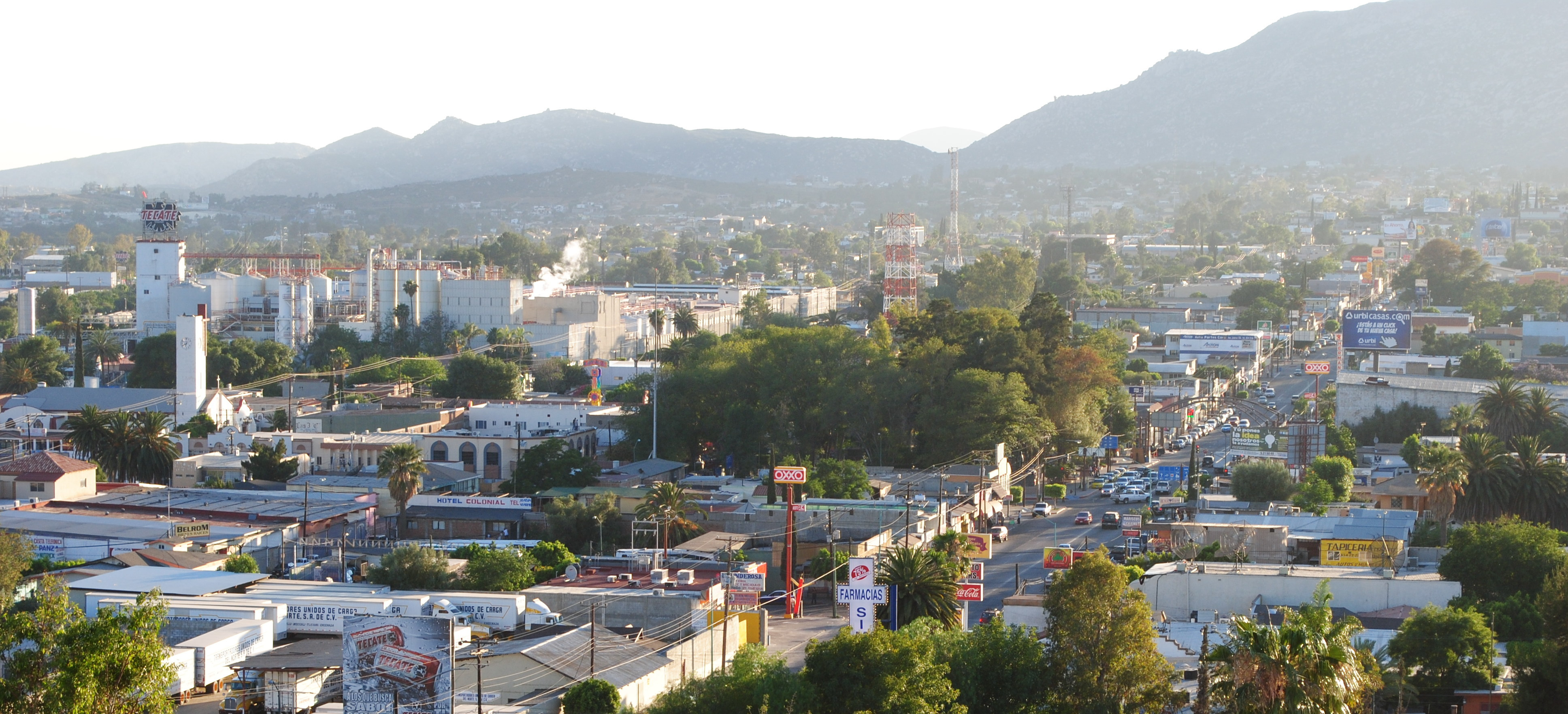
- Top: Parque Miguel Hidalgo (left) and President Lázaro Cárdenas Street (right); bottom: aerial view

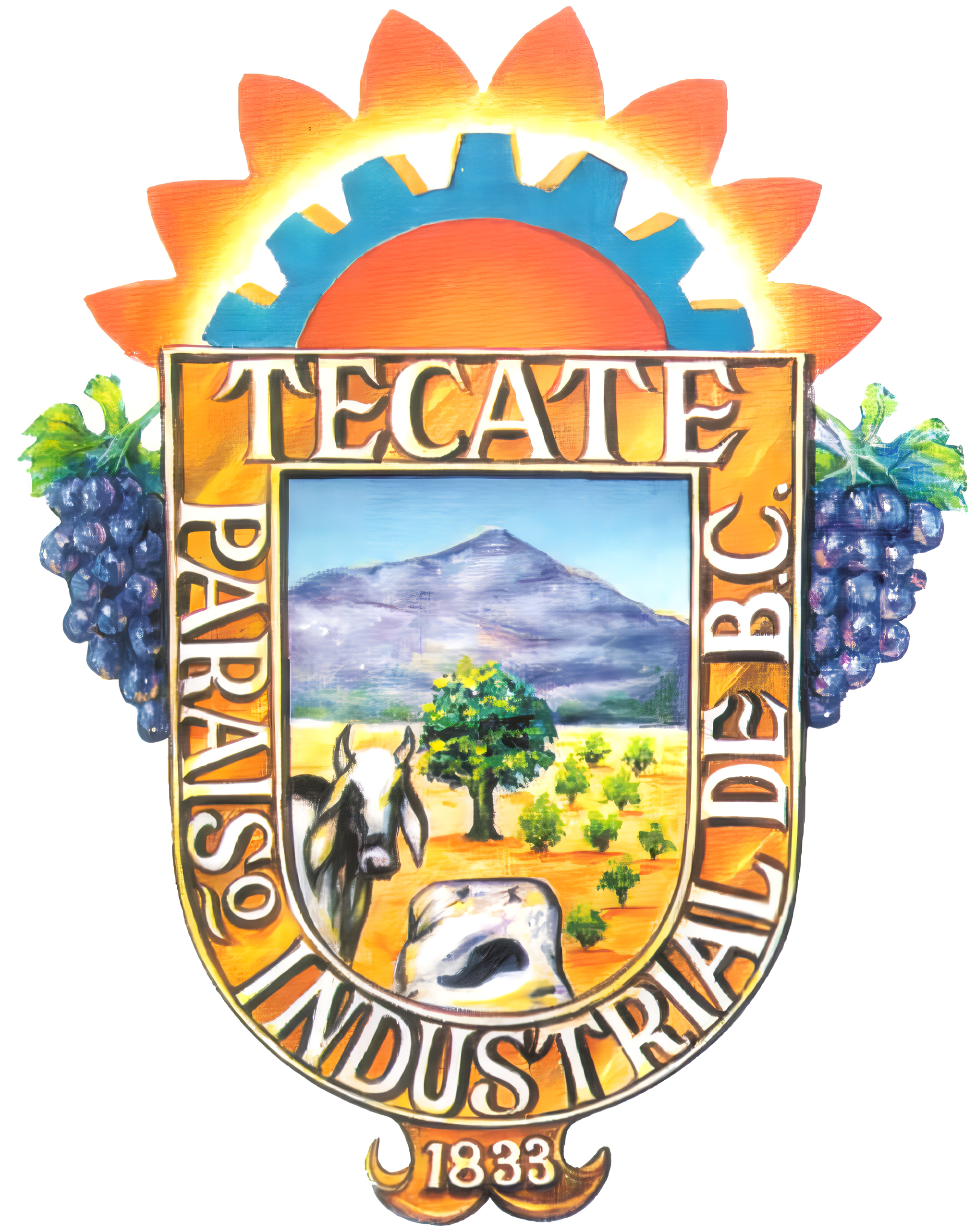
- Coat of arms

- Location in Mexico Tecate (Mexico)
- Coordinates: 32°34′20″N 116°38′25″W
- Country: Mexico
- State: Baja California
- Municipality: Tecate
- Founded: October 12, 1892

Government
  - Type: Ayuntamiento
  - Municipal President: Dario Benitez

Area
  - City: 24.63 km^{2} (9.51 sq mi)
- Elevation: 540 m (1,770 ft)

Population (2019)
  - City: 108,860
  - Density: 4,420/km^{2} (11,450/sq mi)
  - Metro: 132,406
- Demonym: Tecatense
- Time zone: UTC–08:00 (Zona Noroeste)
  - Summer (DST): UTC–07:00 (DST)
- Postal codes: 21400–21499
- Area code: +52 665
- Website: www.tecate.gob.mx

Tecate (Spanish: [teˈkate]) is a city in Baja California. It is across the Mexico–US border from Tecate, California. As of 2019, the municipality had a population of 108,860 inhabitants, while the metropolitan area has a population of 132,406 inhabitants. the city of Tecate is part of the San Diego–Tijuana metropolitan region and the largest city between Tijuana and Mexicali. Tecate is a regional economic hub and popular tourist destination, known as home to the Tecate Port of Entry and to Tecate beer.

== History ==
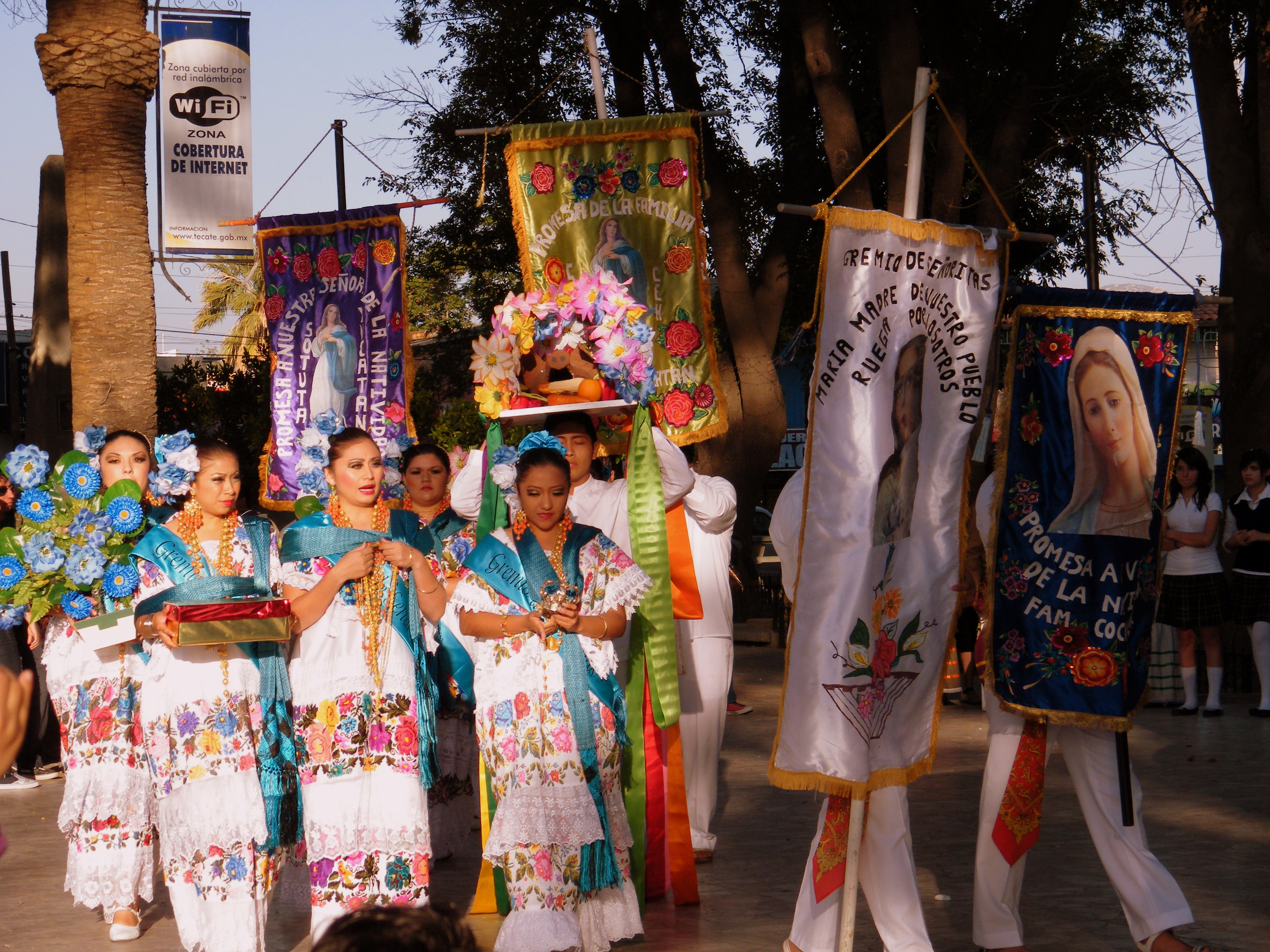
Catholic procession in Tecate.

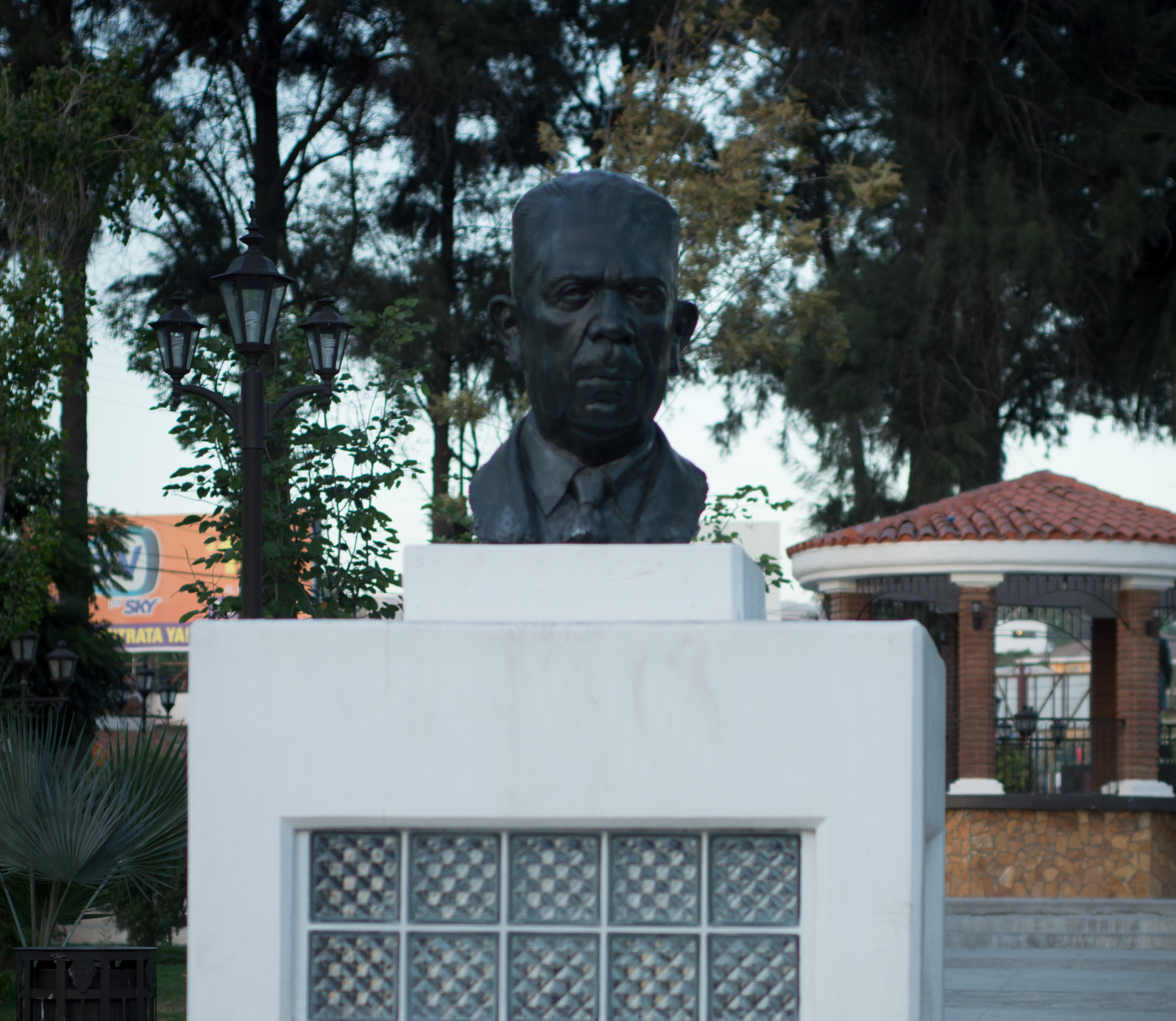
Lázaro Cárdenas memorial.

Tecate is in a valley surrounded by several hills and mountains, the most prominent and famous of them being Kuuchamaa (also spelled Kuchamaa and Cuchama) Mountain. Kuuchamaa Mountain, also known as Tecate Peak in the United States, is a sacred mountain for the Kumeyaay people (known in Mexico as Kumiai) people, and the Kumeyaay language is still spoken in the mountains near Tecate at Juntas de Nejí. Kuuchamaa is rich in greenery, wildflowers and birds. Tecatenses as well as tourists are often seen enjoying hikes and bike rides along its many trails.

In 1829, the Mexican governor of Alta California José María de Echeandía granted the valley of Tecate as the 1,796 ha (4,439-acre) Rancho Tecate to Juan Bandini. In 1836 the mountain dwelling Kumeyaay with some aid from some former mission neophytes, raided and plundered the rancho. They besieged the ranch house but the men within managed to hold out until it was relieved by a force from San Diego. With his stock and horses stolen and the house burned, Bandini—like owners of other ranchos near San Diego—had to abandon the isolated rancho. Due to the continuing hostilities with the Kumeyaay, Bandini never returned, being compensated with Rancho Jurupa in 1838.

In the late 19th century farmers and ranchers arrived in Tecate for the first time since Bandini's failed attempt to settle there. They discovered its plentiful natural resources and decided to settle. Its abundant water and fertile soil made Tecate the perfect site for a productive farm market. Olives, grapes and grain became Tecate's staple crops. The industrial sector was developed with the simultaneous creation of coffee processing plants and breweries.

The town was founded on 2 April 1888 and formally incorporated as a city on 12 October 1892. In 1919, Governor Esteban Cantú ordered the first urban plan for the city, charging engineer Luis Pavón with its design and implementation.

In 1953, Tecate Municipality was separated from Tijuana Municipality, with Tecate designated as the municipal seat.

Well known for its traditional infrastructure and looks, Tecate remains true to its origins with its main plaza in the center of the city and its city hall and historic church within walking distance.

== Geography ==
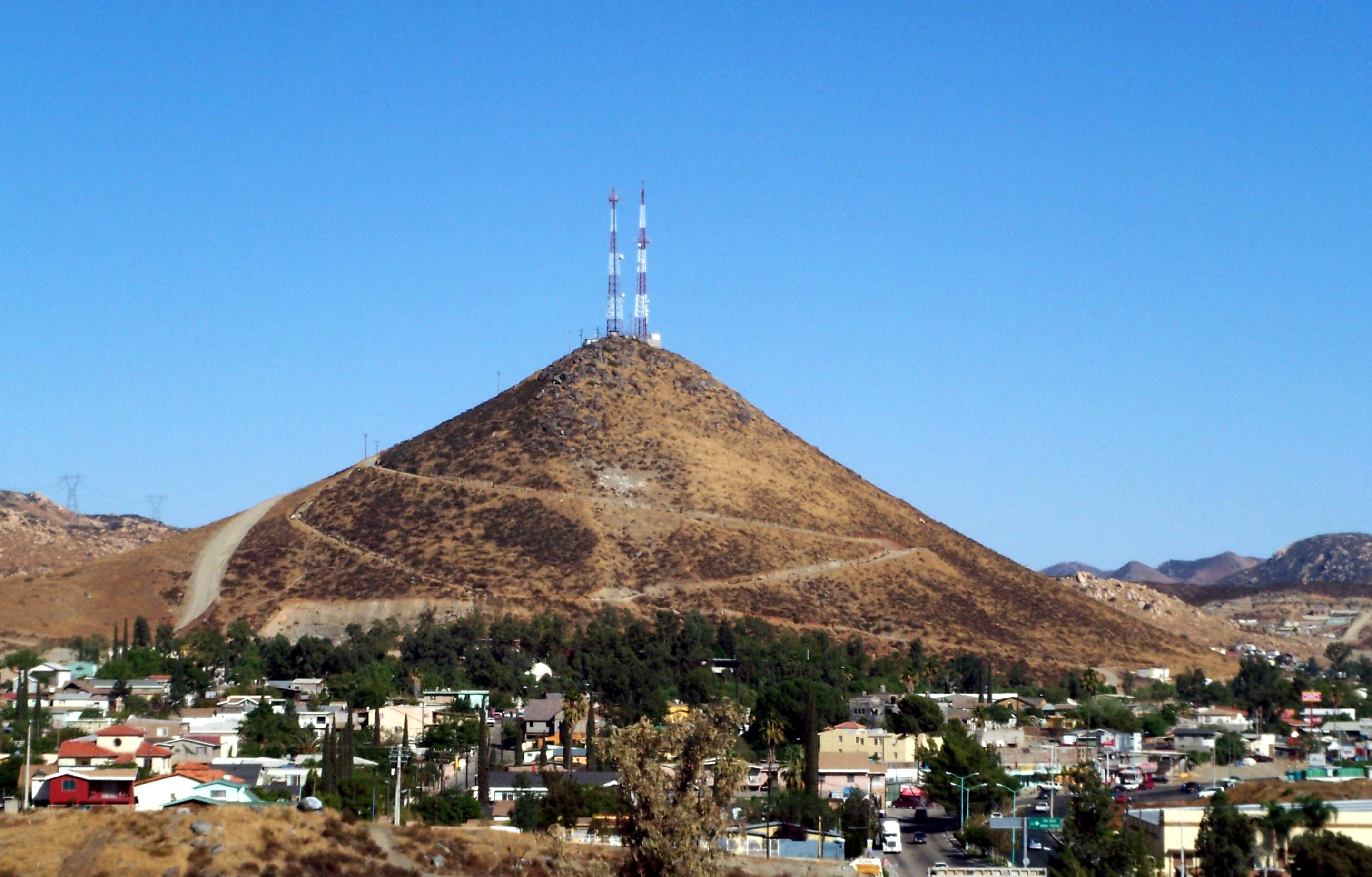
View of Cerro La Panocha.

Tecate's altitude of approximately 540 m (1,770 ft) above sea level and its proximity to the ocean contribute to the temperate climate. It rains enough in the area (almost 360 mm [14 in] per year) for a thick ground cover of shrubs and scattered trees to grow.

The gradual transition from coastal to desert climate is on the eastern side of the peninsular mountains a few miles east. Although often boulder-strewn, much of the land to the east of the city is taken up with ejidos, or cooperative farms.

Tecate is also the name of a small river that courses through the city, and of a hamlet on the Alta California (US side) of the border, affectionately known as "Tecatito" (population around 100; ZIP code 91980).

=== Climate ===
Tecate is hot and dry during the summer and cool and sometimes rainy during the winter. It is classified as a hot-summer mediterranean climate (Köppen: Csa).

Climate data for Tecate (La Puerta) 1991–2020
Month	Jan	Feb	Mar	Apr	May	Jun	Jul	Aug	Sep	Oct	Nov	Dec	Year
Record high °C (°F)	32.0 (89.6)	32.0 (89.6)	36.0 (96.8)	39.0 (102.2)	42.0 (107.6)	44.0 (111.2)	44.0 (111.2)	47.0 (116.6)	46.0 (114.8)	41.1 (106.0)	39.0 (102.2)	32.0 (89.6)	47.0 (116.6)
Mean daily maximum °C (°F)	20.8 (69.4)	20.9 (69.6)	22.6 (72.7)	25.2 (77.4)	27.6 (81.7)	31.7 (89.1)	34.9 (94.8)	35.8 (96.4)	33.9 (93.0)	30.0 (86.0)	25.1 (77.2)	21.2 (70.2)	27.5 (81.5)
Daily mean °C (°F)	12.3 (54.1)	12.6 (54.7)	14.1 (57.4)	16.0 (60.8)	18.3 (64.9)	21.4 (70.5)	24.7 (76.5)	25.3 (77.5)	23.7 (74.7)	20.0 (68.0)	15.6 (60.1)	12.4 (54.3)	18.0 (64.4)
Mean daily minimum °C (°F)	3.8 (38.8)	4.3 (39.7)	5.7 (42.3)	6.8 (44.2)	9.0 (48.2)	11.1 (52.0)	14.5 (58.1)	15.3 (59.5)	13.5 (56.3)	9.9 (49.8)	6.1 (43.0)	3.7 (38.7)	8.6 (47.5)
Record low °C (°F)	−9.0 (15.8)	−8.0 (17.6)	−5.0 (23.0)	−2.0 (28.4)	0.5 (32.9)	0.0 (32.0)	2.0 (35.6)	1.0 (33.8)	2.0 (35.6)	−3.0 (26.6)	−3.0 (26.6)	−4.0 (24.8)	−9.0 (15.8)
Average precipitation mm (inches)	86.6 (3.41)	92.4 (3.64)	55.0 (2.17)	25.5 (1.00)	17.0 (0.67)	1.9 (0.07)	3.1 (0.12)	2.5 (0.10)	5.3 (0.21)	14.3 (0.56)	35.2 (1.39)	58.5 (2.30)	397.3 (15.64)
Average precipitation days (≥ 0.1 mm)	6.4	6.7	5.5	3.6	2.2	0.4	0.6	0.4	0.8	1.8	3.2	5.3	36.9
Source: Servicio Meteorologico Nacional

== Demographics ==
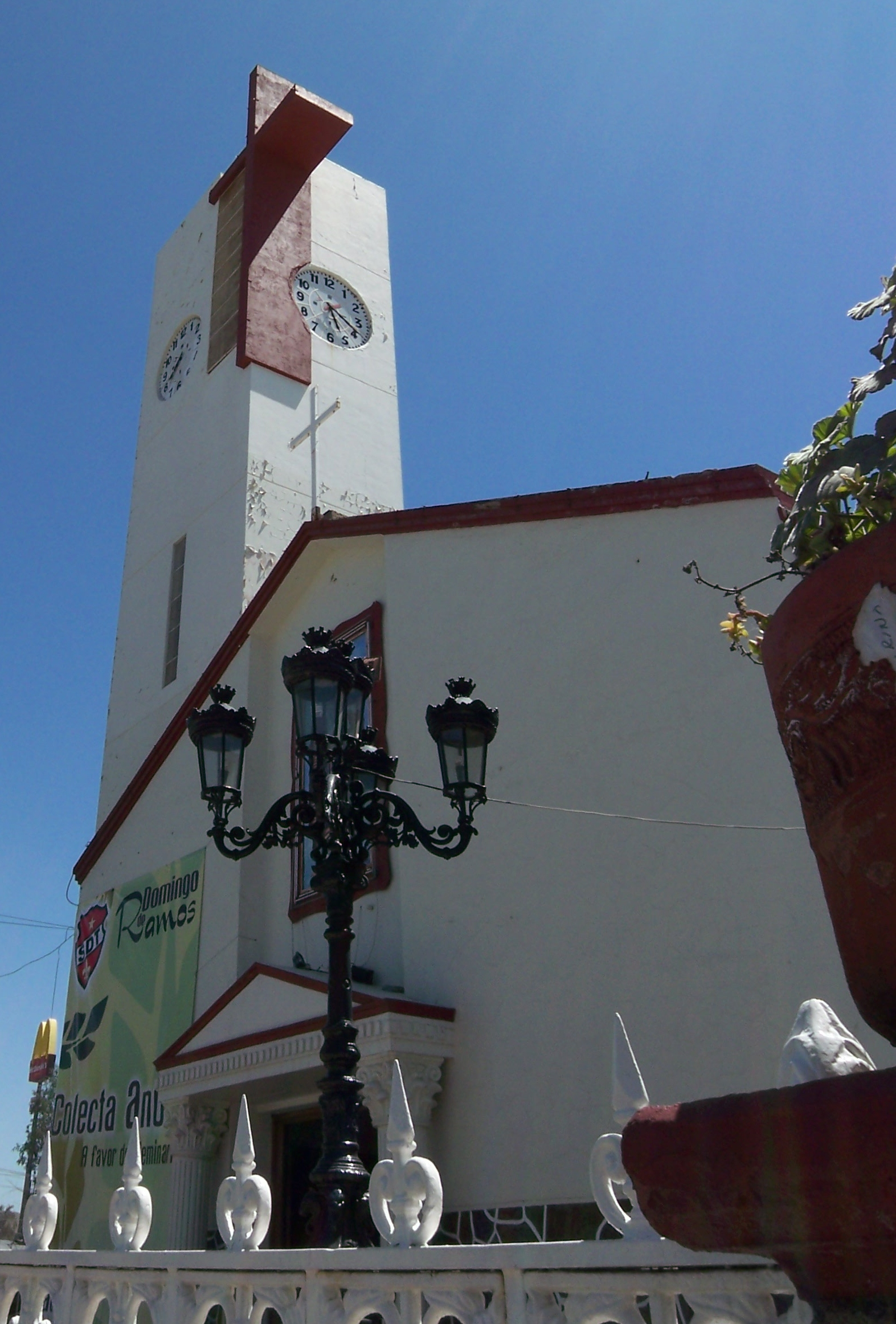
Our Lady of Guadalupe Church, part of the Catholic Archdiocese of Tijuana.

Tecate had a population of 108,860 inhabitants in 2019, up from 72,860 in the 2015 census.

The Tecate metro area has a population of 132,406 inhabitants.

== Economy ==
Tecate is the site of the first brewery of Tecate Beer. Industrial companies from across the border have their manufacturing affiliates there (e.g., Rockwell Automation, Ingersoll-Rand, Milwaukee Electronics, Automation Controls Group and Oberg Industries).

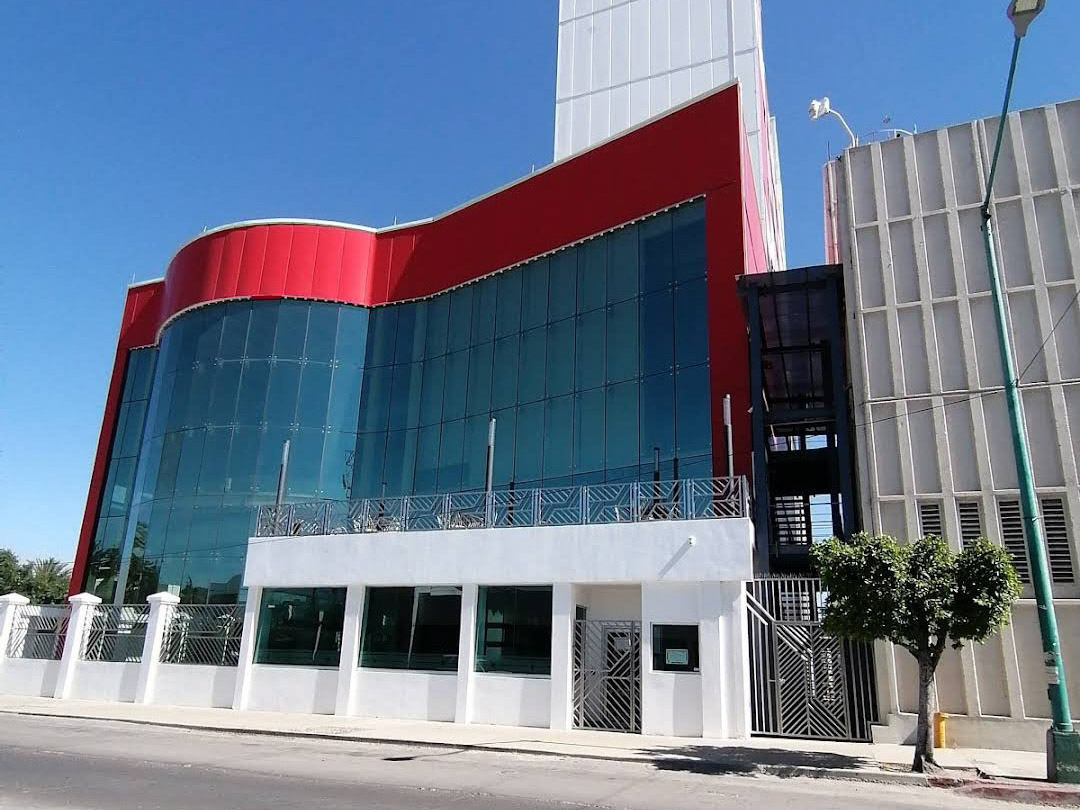
The Cuauhtémoc Moctezuma Brewery produces Tecate (beer).

The city is served by a couple of hospitals and several clinics, as well as a couple dozen doctors and dentists.

=== Tourism ===
Tecate has been designated as a Pueblos Mágico by Mexico's Secretariat of Tourism because of its cultural richness, and it is the only Pueblo Magico located along the Mexico–United States border. In summer/early fall, the annual Tecate-to-Ensenada bicycle race takes place, with thousands of cyclists from both sides of the border participating. July is the time for a two-week celebration in Los Encinos Park, featuring dance groups, crafts, food concessions, and exhibits.

The pamplonada, or running of the bulls, was ordinarily held in August in the 1980s and early 1990s along one of the main streets, but it was canceled because of a series of accidents and violence.

Tecate has a stadium, Manuel Ceceña, which is home to the local baseball team, the Cerveceros ("Brewers").

== Education ==
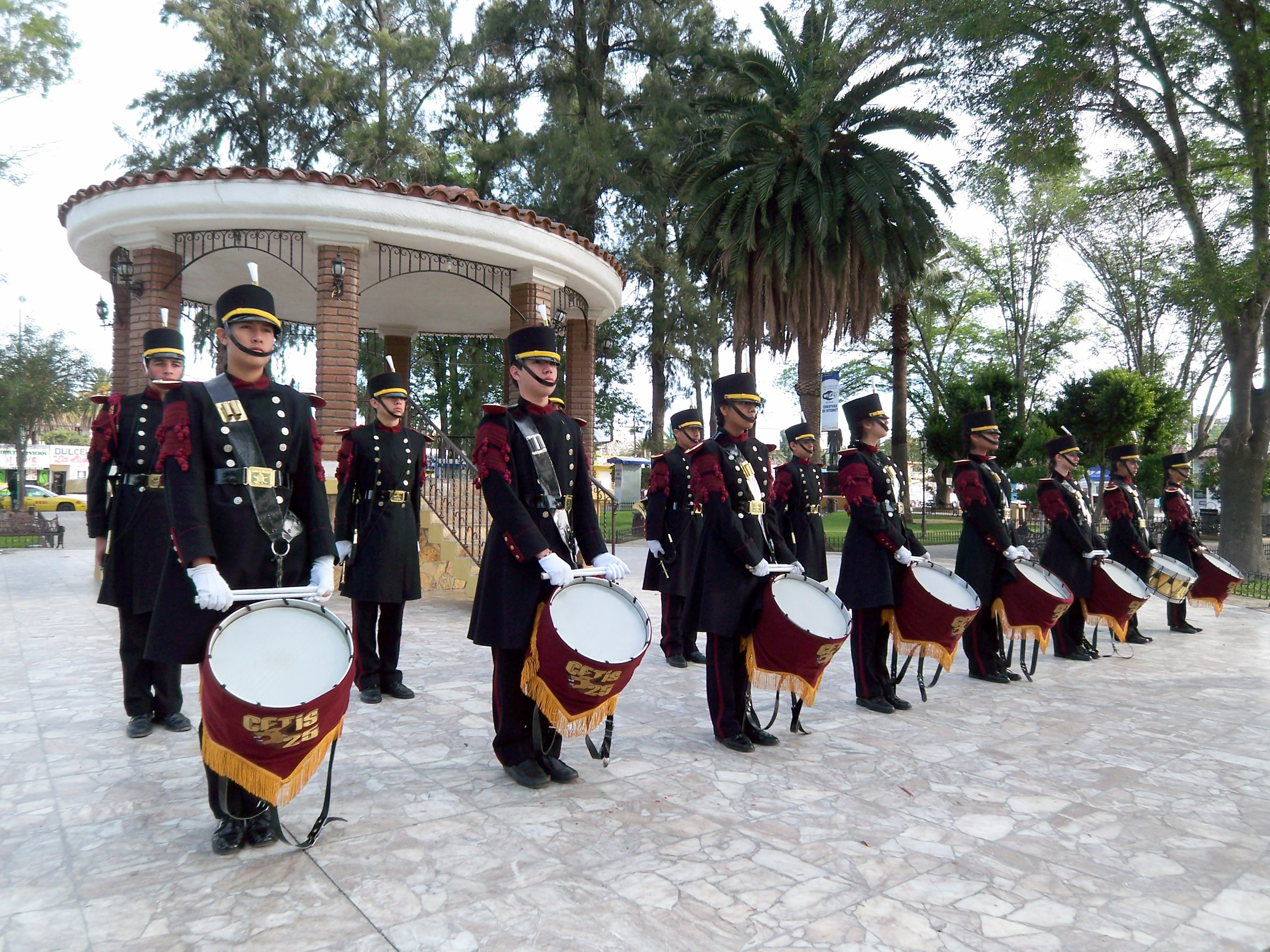
Band of CETIS high school.

Tecate is the site of the Autonomous University of Baja California, Tecate. The school houses a school of engineering.

Tecate has a competition every year for 5th grade students where they share their ideas to change their community in a positive way. The best one competes against the best ones of each city of the state. The winner competes against the other states, and the winner meets the President of Mexico.

== Transportation ==
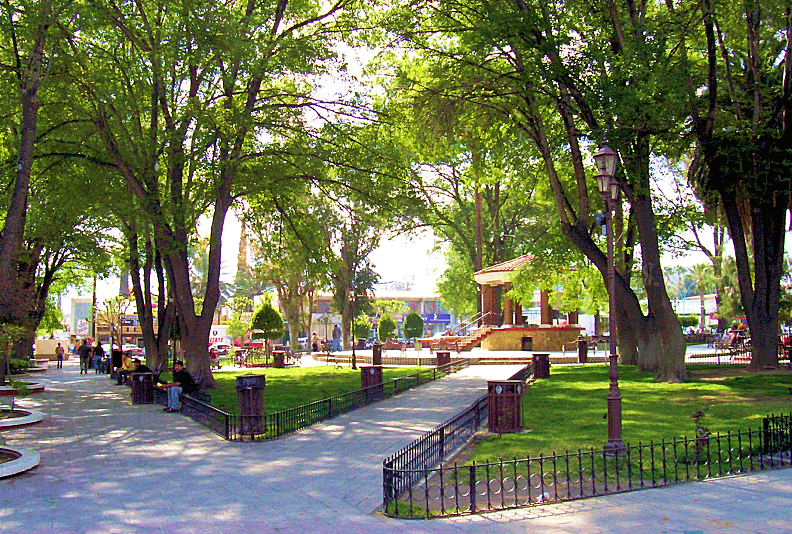
Downtown Tecate.

Tecate is on a spur of Mexican Federal Highway 2 that connects Tijuana with Mexicali via the central Sierra mountains. It is on the older, two-lane, east-west road which is toll-free.

A train from Campo, California, called the Tecate Ticket, travels to Tecate on a monthly basis (currently suspended due to a tunnel fire along the route). The train is run by the Pacific Southwest Railway Museum.

The city is the location of the Tecate Airport, at Maclovio Herrera, which no longer operates due to low traffic. Instead, Tecate residents are served by nearby Tijuana International Airport (TIJ), with flights to most major Mexican cities. TIJ is closer to Tecate than Mexicali International Airport and thus used more frequently by Tecate residents.

== See also ==
- Tecate (beer)
- Tecate Divide
- Tecate Municipality
