= Tecate, California =

Unincorporated community in California, United States

Tecate
- Unincorporated community
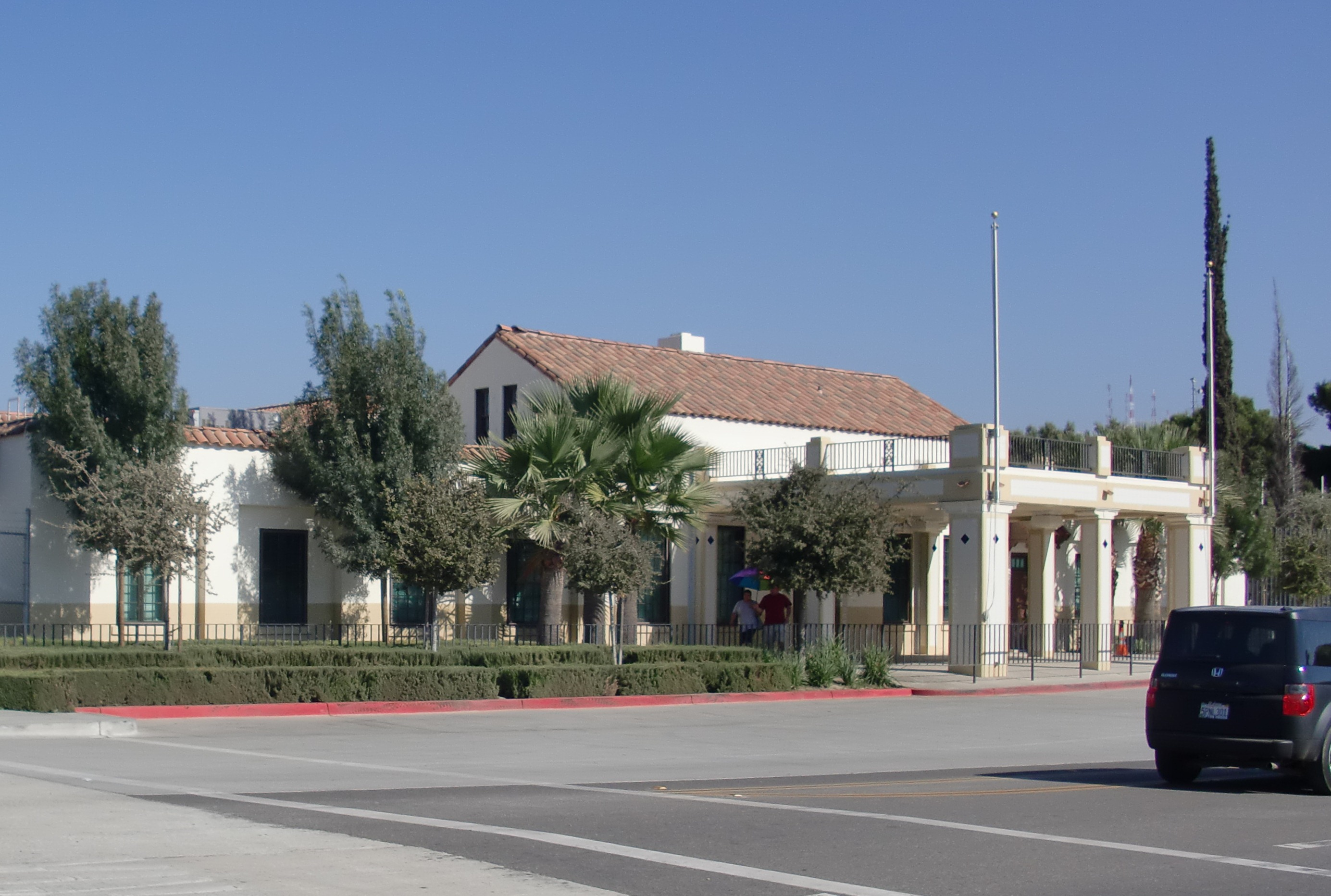
- Tecate Port of Entry

- Location within the state of California Tecate (the United States)
- Coordinates: 32°34′38″N 116°37′39″W
- Country: United States
- State: California
- County: San Diego
- Elevation: 1,778 ft (542 m)

Population (2000)
  - Total: 207 (71.01% of the population is Hispanic or Latino of any race)
- Time zone: UTC-8 (Pacific (PST))
  - Summer (DST): UTC-7 (PDT)
- ZIP codes: 91980
- Area code: 619
- GNIS feature ID: 1661553

Tecate is an unincorporated community in the Mountain Empire area of central southeastern San Diego County, California, United States. It is directly north of the Mexico–United States border and the Mexican city of Tecate in Baja California.

It is nicknamed Tecatito ("Little Tecate") because of its smaller size compared with the Mexican city.

The Tecate Port of Entry is located here, and Tecate Peak is nearby.
