= Batres (surname) =

Batres is a surname. Notable people with the surname include:

- Carlos Batres (born 1968), Guatemalan football referee
- Eugenio Batres Garcia (born 1941), Nicaraguan journalist, political commentator, newscaster and writer
- Jaime Batres (born 1964), Guatemalan footballer
- José Batres Montúfar (1809–1844), Guatemalan poet, politician, engineer and military figure
- Leopoldo Batres (1852–1926), Mexican archeologist
- Luis Batres Juarros (1802–1862), Guatemalan politician
- Martí Batres (born 1967), Mexican politician
- Roberto Batres (born 1986), Spanish footballer
- Valentina Batres Guadarrama (born 1971), Mexican politician
- Yolani Batres, Honduran politician
- Luis Perez Batres, Mexican/American University Professor and Administrator
