= Lorena Villavicencio Ayala =

Mexican politician

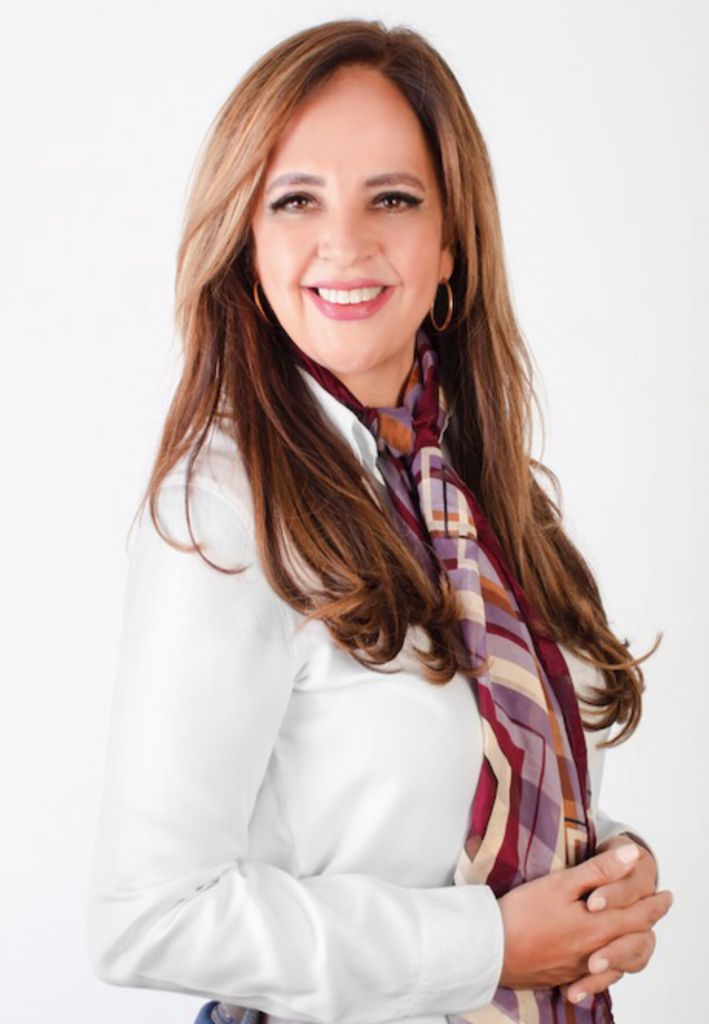

Member of the Chamber of Deputies
- In office 2018–2021
- Succeeded by: Xavier González Zirión

Personal details
- Born: Ocotlán, Jalisco, Mexico
- Political party: Morena

Silvia Lorena Villavicencio Ayala (born in Ocotlán, Jalisco) is a Mexican politician affiliated with the National Regeneration Movement party (MORENA). She was a federal deputy between 2018 and 2021 for the Sixteenth Federal Electoral District of Mexico City (Álvaro Obregón).

== Political career ==
Her political life began in February 1997, when she joined the Democratic Current headed by Cuauhtémoc Cárdenas, Porfirio Muñoz Ledo and Ifigenia Martínez. In 2021, she lost reelection to Xavier González Zirión, the Institutional Revolutionary Party candidate, by 11.57% of the votes.

== Legislative proposals ==
- Proposed the decriminalization of the interruption of pregnancy up to 12 weeks.
- Proposed the classification of femicide as a serious crime.
- Proposed providing psychological care to victims of sexual violence.
- Proposed a General Law on Sexual Diversity.
- Proposed a minimum vital emergency income.
- Presented an initiative for minors linked to organized crime.
- Proposed a reform of rights for domestic workers.
- Promoted a National Care System.
