= Imao =

Imao may refer to:

- Abdulmari Imao (Abdulmari Asia Imao, 1936–2014), Filipino painter and sculptor
- Toym Imao (Abdulmari de Leon Imao, Jr, born 1968), Filipino educator and multi-media visual artist
- Imao Keinen (1845–1924), Japanese painter and print designer
- Instituto Miguel Ángel de Occidente (IMAO), a private school in Zapopan, Jalisco, Mexico

== See also ==
- LMAO, internet slang
- Imaw, fictional character in Encantadia
