= Leticia Robles Colín =

Mexican politician

- Born: 21 February 1960 (age 66); Mexico City, Mexico
- Occupation: Politician
- Political party: PRI

Leticia Robles Colín (born 21 February 1960) is a Mexican politician. She was a member of the Party of the Democratic Revolution (PRD) until 2010, when she joined the Institutional Revolutionary Party (PRI).

She has served as a federal deputy on two occasions: in the 57th Congress (1997–2000) and in the 61st Congress (2009–2012), representing on both occasions the Federal District's sixteenth district.

She also served as the mayor of the Mexico City borough of Álvaro Obregón from 2003 to 2006. She competed for the same position again in 2012 and 2015, but was unsuccessful.
