= Víctor Suárez =

Víctor Suárez may refer to:

- Víctor Suárez Carrera (born 1952), Mexican politician from Mexico City
- Víctor Suárez Meléndez, Puerto Rican politician, secretary of state in 2015–2017
- Victor Tadashi Suarez, U.S. documentary filmmaker
