= Guadalupe Inn =

- Neighborhood
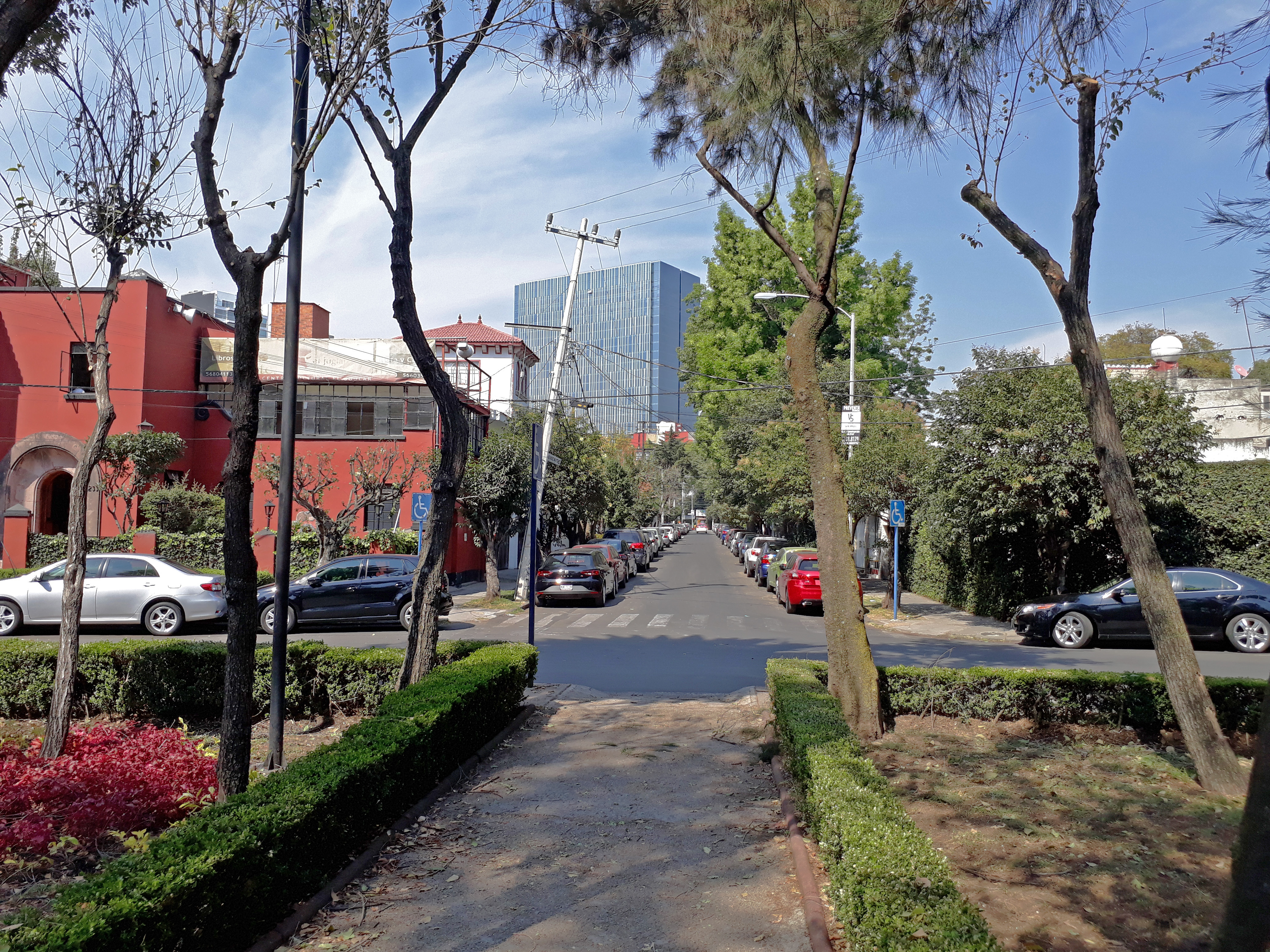
- View of Guadalupe Inn from Plaza Valverde
- Country: Mexico
- City: Mexico City
- Borough: Álvaro Obregón

Population (2022)
  - Total: 3,599
- Postal code: 01020

Guadalupe Inn is a colonia in Mexico City.

== Location ==
Guadalupe Inn is located in the Álvaro Obregón borough, in southern Mexico City.

The neighborhood is bordered by:

- Barranca del Muerto to the north, across which is San José Insurgentes in the Benito Juárez
- Av. Revolución to the west, across which is Colonia Los Alpes and Colonia Campestre
- Pedro Luis Ogazón street to the south, across which is San Ángel
- Avenida de los Insurgentes Sur, across which is Colonia Florida

== History ==
Guadalupe Inn was developed in the 1950s at the same time that adjacent Colonia Florida in the lands of Hacienda de Guadalupe, property of José de Teresa, brother in law of Porfirio Díaz.

The neighborhood was planned with a modern design, with a roundabout in the center from which several diagonal streets would depart towards the limit of Guadalupe Inn. From its conception, the colonia was planned as a residential zone, but in recent years commercial buildings and multi-story buildings have been constructed near Av. Revolución and Avenida de los Insurgentes.

Lately, the construction of tall buildings at the interior of the area has provoked negative reactions from the neighbors.

== Street nomenclature ==
The streets in the neighborhood have names of Mexican composers such as Juventino Rosas, Macedonio Alcalá, Silvestre Revueltas and Felipe Villanueva.

In 1991, the segment of the Felipe Villanueva street between Manuel M. Ponce and Insurgentes Sur was changed to Su Santidad Juan Pablo II, in honor of Pope John Paul II, this, due to the fact of the Apostolic Nunciature in Mexico being located here. This was done despite a clear breach of the regulations for streets nomenclature changes of the Nomenclature Commission of the Federal District.

== Transportation ==
=== Public transportation ===
The area is served by the Mexico City Metro and Metrobús.

Metro stations

- Barranca del Muerto

Metrobús stations

- José María Velasco
- Francia
- Olivo
- Altavista
