= María Villaseñor Vargas =

Mexican politician

- Born: 23 November 1960 (age 65); Cuauhtémoc, D.F., Mexico
- Occupation: Deputy
- Political party: PRI

María de la Paloma Villaseñor Vargas (born 23 November 1960) is a Mexican politician affiliated with the PRI. In 1991–1994 she served as a federal deputy in the 57th Congress, representing the Federal District's sixteenth district. She returned to the Chamber of Deputies for 62nd Congress as a plurinominal deputy for the fourth electoral region.
