= Vermont School =

Private school in Mexico City

- Spanish: Colegio Vermont, S.C.

Information
- Established: 1998; 28 years ago

Vermont School (Spanish: Colegio Vermont, S.C.) is a private school in Mexico City. It has two campuses: Plantel Pedregal in Jardines del Pedregal, Álvaro Obregón, which has preschool and primary school; and Plantel San Jerónimo, in San Jerónimo, Magdalena Contreras, serving middle school (secundaria) and senior high school (preparatoria).

== History ==
Previously its divisions were Vermy Bear, Vermont School, and Vermont Institute (Instituto Vermont, S.C.), with the first and last campuses in Jardines del Pedregal and Vermont School in San Jerónimo. Vermont Institute opened in 1998.
