= Instituto Miguel Ángel =

Instituto Miguel Ángel, A.C. (IMA) is a private school in Colonia Florida, Álvaro Obregón, Mexico City. It serves preschool through senior high school.

It is affiliated with the Instituto Miguel Ángel de Occidente in the Guadalajara area.

It belongs to the Congregation of the Sisters of Charity of the Incarnate Word which is headquartered in the University of the Incarnate Word in San Antonio, Texas.

The university and institute created the Centro Universitario Incarnate Word.
