= 16th federal electoral district of Mexico City =

Federal electoral district of Mexico

Mexico City's 16th
- Electoral district of the Chamber of Deputies of Mexico

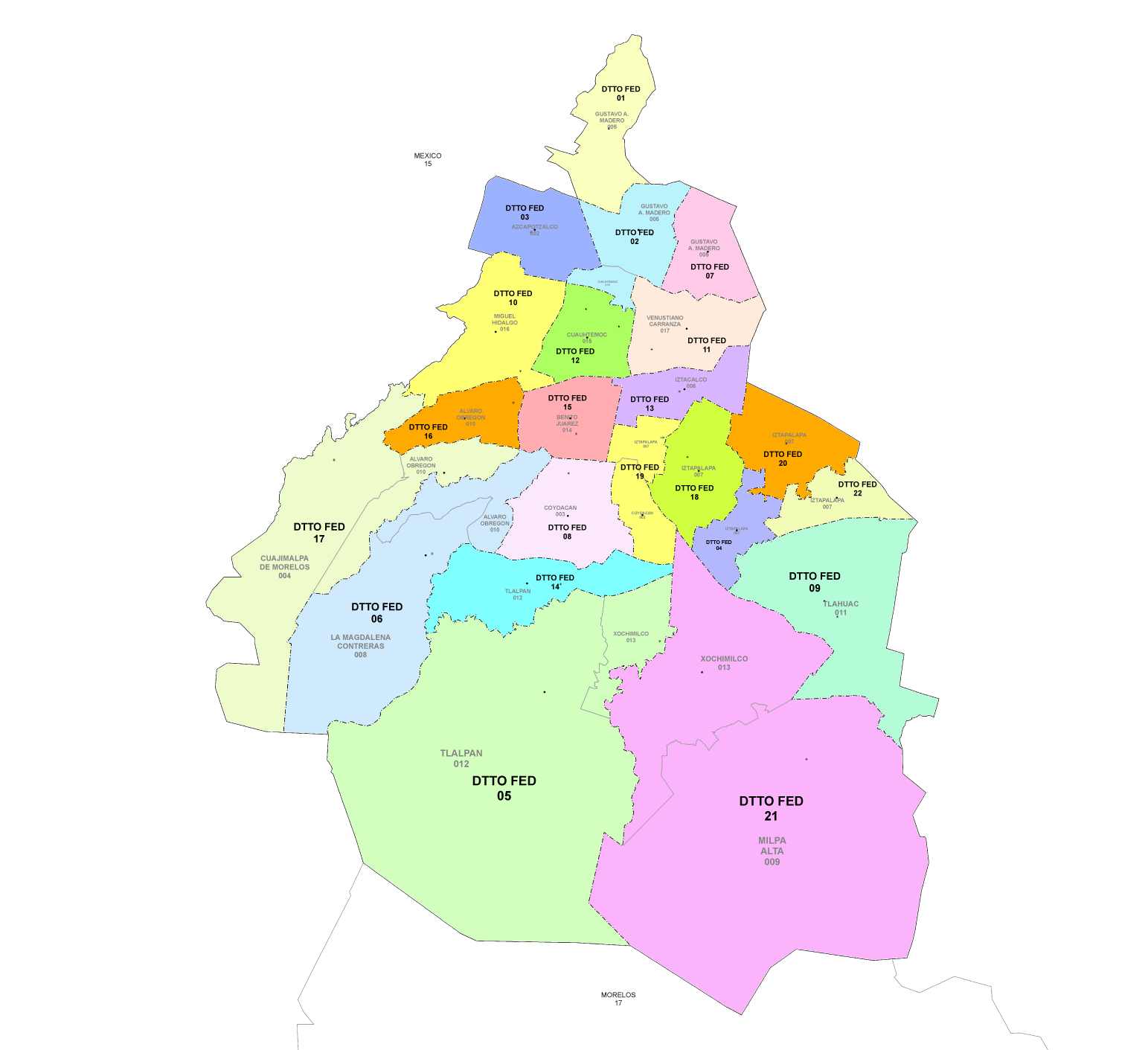
- 16th district since 2023

Incumbent
- Member: Carina Piceno Navarro
- Party: ▌Morena
- Congress: 66th (2024–2027)

District
- State: Mexico City
- Head town: Álvaro Obregón
- Coordinates: 19°21′23″N 99°14′10″W
- Covers: Álvaro Obregón (part)
- PR region: Fourth
- Precincts: 240
- Population: 386,317 (2020 census)

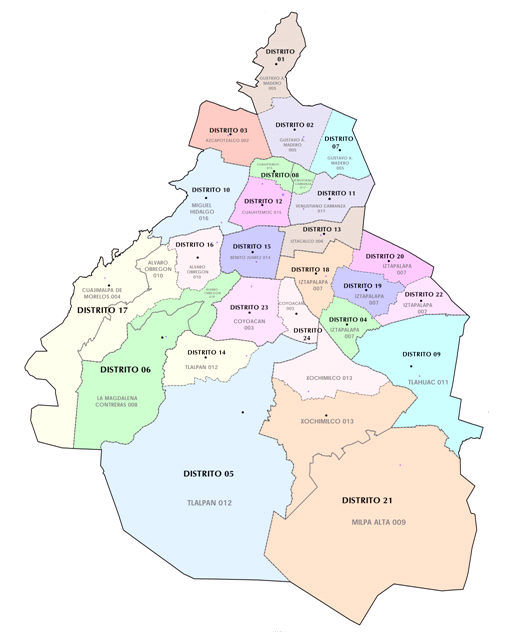
Mexico City under the 2017–2022 districting plan

The 16th federal electoral district of Mexico City (Spanish: Distrito electoral federal 16 de la Ciudad de México; prior to 2016, "of the Federal District") is one of the 300 electoral districts into which Mexico is divided for elections to the federal Chamber of Deputies and one of the 22 currently operational districts in Mexico City.

It elects one deputy to the lower house of Congress for each three-year legislative session by means of the first-past-the-post system. Votes cast in the district also count towards the calculation of proportional representation ("plurinominal") deputies elected from the fourth region.

The current member for the district, elected in the 2024 general election, is Estela Carina Piceno Navarro of the National Regeneration Movement (Morena).

== District territory ==
Under the 2023 districting plan adopted by the National Electoral Institute (INE), which is to be used for the 2024, 2027 and 2030 federal elections, the 16th district covers 240 electoral precincts (secciones electorales) in the northern portion of the borough (alcaldía) of Álvaro Obregón.

The district reported a population of 386,317 in the 2020 census.

== Previous districting schemes ==
Evolution of electoral district numbers
	1974	1978	1996	2005	2017	2023
Mexico City (Federal District)	27	40	30	27	24	22
Chamber of Deputies	196	300				

2017–2022

Between 2017 and 2022 the 16th district covered 250 precincts in the borough of Álvaro Obregón. The remainder of the borough was in the 6th district.

2005–2017

Under the 2005 districting scheme, the 16th district covered the northern portion of Álvaro Obregón.

1996–2005

Between 1996 and 2005, the district was located in the borough of Álvaro Obregón.

1978–1996

The districting scheme in force from 1978 to 1996 was the result of the 1977 electoral reforms, which increased the number of single-member seats in the Chamber of Deputies from 196 to 300. Under that plan, the Federal District's seat allocation rose from 27 to 40. The 16th district covered the bulk of the borough of Benito Juárez.

== Deputies returned to Congress ==
(Mexico) National parties
- Current
- PAN
- PRI
- PT
- PVEM
- MC
- Morena
- PAZ
- Somos
- Defunct or local only
- PLM
- PNR
- PRM
- PNM
- PP
- PPS
- PARM
- PFCRN
- CON
- PANAL
- PSD
- PES
- PES
- PRD

Mexico City's 16th district
Election	Deputy	Party	Term	Legislature
1952	Ramón Cabrera Cosío	Institutional Revolutionary Party	1952–1955	42nd Congress
1955	Luis M. Farías	Institutional Revolutionary Party	1955–1958	43rd Congress
1958	Rubén Marín y Kall	Institutional Revolutionary Party	1958–1961	44th Congress
1961	Salvador López Avitia	Institutional Revolutionary Party	1961–1964	45th Congress
1964	Ramón Zentella Ascencio	Institutional Revolutionary Party	1964–1967	46th Congress
1967	Fernando Córdoba Lobo	Institutional Revolutionary Party	1967–1970	47th Congress
1970	Rafael Argüelles Sánchez	Institutional Revolutionary Party	1970–1973	48th Congress
1973	Luis del Toro Calero	Institutional Revolutionary Party	1973–1976	49th Congress
1976	Alfonso Argudín Laria	Institutional Revolutionary Party	1976–1979	50th Congress
1979	Jorge Flores Vizcarra	Institutional Revolutionary Party	1979–1982	51st Congress
1982	José Aguilar Alcérreca	Institutional Revolutionary Party	1982–1985	52nd Congress
1985	Francisco Berlín Valenzuela	Institutional Revolutionary Party	1985–1988	53rd Congress
1988	José Arturo Ocampo Villalobos	National Action Party (Mexico)	1988–1991	54th Congress
1991	Paloma Villaseñor Vargas	Institutional Revolutionary Party	1991–1994	55th Congress
1994	Víctor Manuel Rubio	Institutional Revolutionary Party	1994–1997	56th Congress
1997	Leticia Robles Colín		1997–2000	57th Congress
2000	Carlos Alberto Flores Gutiérrez	National Action Party (Mexico)	2000–2003	58th Congress
2003	Víctor Suárez Carrera	Party of the Democratic Revolution	2003–2006	59th Congress
2006	Valentina Batres Guadarrama	Party of the Democratic Revolution	2006–2009	60th Congress
2009	Leticia Robles Colín	Party of the Democratic Revolution	2009–2012	61st Congress
2012	Mario Miguel Carrillo Huerta	Party of the Democratic Revolution	2012–2015	62nd Congress
2015	Cristina García Bravo	Party of the Democratic Revolution	2015–2018	63rd Congress
2018	Lorena Villavicencio Ayala	National Regeneration Movement	2018–2021	64th Congress
2021	Xavier González Zirión	Institutional Revolutionary Party	2021–2024	65th Congress
2024	Estela Carina Piceno Navarro	National Regeneration Movement	2024–2027	66th Congress

== Presidential elections ==
Mexico City's 16th district
Election	District won by	Party or coalition	%
2018	Andrés Manuel López Obrador	Juntos Haremos Historia	56.7214
2024	Claudia Sheinbaum Pardo	Sigamos Haciendo Historia	57.2621
