= Mario Miguel Carrillo Huerta =

Mexican politician

- Born: 4 June 1947 (age 78); Colima, Colima, Mexico
- Occupation: Deputy
- Political party: PRD

Mario Miguel Carrillo Huerta (born 4 June 1947) is a Mexican politician affiliated with the Party of the Democratic Revolution (PRD). In 2012–2015 he served as a federal deputy in the 62nd Congress, representing the Federal District's sixteenth district for the PRD.
