= Max Cetto =

German-Mexican architect, historian of architecture and professor

Max L. Cetto
- Born: February 20, 1903; Koblenz, Rhine Province, German Empire
- Died: April 5, 1980 (aged 77); Mexico City, Mexico
- Occupation: Architect

Max Ludwig Cetto (February 20, 1903 – April 5, 1980) was a German-Mexican architect, historian of architecture, and professor.

== Life ==
Born in Koblenz, Germany, Max Cetto studied at the Technische Hochschule in Darmstadt, Munich and Berlin. At the latter he studied with Hans Poelzig, graduating as an engineer–architect in 1926 and worked then for the New Frankfurt project. After 1929 he taught also some years at the Hochschule für Gestaltung Offenbach.

In 1932, Cetto took part in the competition for the design of the headquarters of the League of Nations in Geneva. Founder-member Congrès International d'Architecture Moderne, 1928. He moved to San Francisco in 1938, where he worked for Los Angeles-based architect Richard Neutra on projects including the Kahn House (1939).

Cetto married Gertrud Catarina Kramis in 1940 and bore three children: Verónica, Ana María and Bettina. He settled in Mexico and became a naturalized Mexican in 1947. As well as having a natural affinity with Mexico, he was able to incorporate his European experiences into what he built there. The respect for nature he had learned from Neutra is evident in his handling of the volcanic terrain of the Jardines del Pedregal, Mexico City, where he collaborated with Luis Barragán, constructing various houses amid the impressive scenery of the place without disturbing the volcanic lava or the vegetation. He also showed skill and great sensitivity in using the materials and techniques of the region.

Among his most outstanding works in Mexico are the San José Purúa hotel & spa in Jungapeo, Michoacán, which he built together with Jorge Rubio (1940); the building for artists at the Melchor Ocampo roundabout, a joint work with Luis Barragán (1940); the Casa Quintana at the Tequesquitengo lake (1947); the Casa-Estudio Rufino Tamayo in Polanco (1949), his own Casa-Estudio (1949), the Casas-Muestra on Av. Fuentes 130 and 140 in the Pedregal (1951); the Temola Tannery, designed together with Félix Candela in Cuautla, Morelos (1967-68), and the German Club of Mexico in Tepepan (1970-79).

His buildings reveal that technical mastery and modernist vision, as well as an ecological and cultural approach ahead of its time, which would profoundly influence Mexican domestic architecture in the mid-twentieth century.

Cetto was also an architectural historian, theorist and professor, at the School of Architecture of the UNAM (1965-1980). He also as gave lectures at several universities in the United States and in Europe. He wrote texts like Modern Architecture in Mexico (1961) that aimed to disseminate the value of Mexican architecture internationally.

He died in 1980, surrounded by his family, in his Casa-Estudio. His legacy, marked by a synthesis of modernity, tradition, artistic sensitivity and respect for the environment, remains a benchmark for contemporary architecture and a bridge between Europe, America and the Mexican landscape.

== Books ==
- Modern Architecture in Mexico. Arquitectura moderna en México. [Translated from the German into English by D. Q. Stephenson. Translated from the German into Spanish by Francisco Maigler]. Praeger, New York, 1961. Verlag Gerd Hatje, Stuttgart, 1961.
- Modern Architecture in Mexico/Arquitectura moderna en México Facsimile Edition, Museo de Arte Moderno, México, 2011

== A more comprehensive list of publications ==
Cetto, Max, “Anmerkungen zur Zeit: das Mehr-scheinen-als-sein ist erfolgreich industrialisiert worden“, Baukunst und Werkform, Nr. 5, Frankfurt am Main, 1954, 247-249

Cetto, Max, “Architecture Mexicaine, 1968-1978”, Techniques et Architecture, No. 320, juin-juillet 1978, Paris, 122-123

Cetto, Max, „Arquitectura moderna en México”, Revista Arquitecto, año 4, No. 14, sept-oct 1979, México, 1979

Cetto, Max, „Brief eines jungen deutschen Architekten an Dr. Goebbels“, Die Neue Stadt, Mai 1933, Zürich, 26–28.

Cetto, Max, “Candela, Felix” in Gerd Hatje, ed. Knaurs Lexikon der Modernen Architektur, Gerd Hatje, München/ Zürich,1963, 58–59.

Cetto, Max, „Carta de un joven arquitecto alemán al Sr. Goebbels, Ministro del Reich de Propaganda e Ilustración del Pueblo”, traducida al español por Mariana Frenk Westheim. Se puede consultar en Dussel Peters, Susanne, Max Cetto: arquitecto mexicano-alemán, UAM, 1995, pp. 70–73

Cetto, Max, „Eine Fabrik von 1903, Das Fabrikgebaude der Spielwarenfabrik Margarete Steiff, Giengen a.d. Brenz (Wttbg)“, Das Neue Frankfurt 4, Frankfurt/ Main, 1932–1933.

Cetto, Max, „Gedanken zur Architektur der Zukunft - Entwicklungstendenzen in Mexiko“ Bauen in der Zukunft, 1. Internationaler Baukongress, DEUBAU ‚64, Essen, 4–6.6.1964, 9-28. (gekürzte Fassung erschienen in : Der Architekt, Nr.10, Essen, Oktober 1964, 311–314.)

Cetto, Max, „Glas und Gesundheit,“ Frankfurter Zeitung, Okt.1929.

Cetto, Max, “Influencias externas y significado de la tradición,“ en Roberto Segre, ed. América Latina en su arquitectura, UNESCO, Siglo XXI eds., México,1975.

Cetto, Max, “Lettre de Mexique”, Zodiac, Nr. 1, Milano, Ottobre 1957, 206.

Cetto, Max, „Mexiko“ in Gerd Hatje (Hg.) Knaurs Lexikon der Modernen Architektur, München/ Zürich, Verlag Gerd Hatje, 1963, 167–169.

Cetto, Max, „Mexiko heute“ in Bauwelt, Nr. 52, Dez.1955, Berlin, 1078.

Cetto, Max, Modern Architecture in Mexico; Arquitectura moderna en México, F. Praeger, New York, 1961.

Cetto, Max, Moderne Architektur in Mexiko, Verlag Gerd Hatje, Stuttgart, 1961.

Cetto, Max, “O Gorman, Juan” in Emanuel Muriel, ed., Contemporary Architects, St. Martin's Press, N.Y., 1980, 594.

Cetto, Max, „Reflexiones sobre la construcción en el futuro“, Revista Calli internacional, revista analítica de arquitectura contemporánea, No. 44, México, 1969, pp. 48–54 (traducción del alemán a cargo de Bettina Cetto). Con esta conferencia se inauguró un Congreso Internacional en Essen, Alemania, cuyo temario era la arquitectura en el futuro.

Cetto, Max, „Richard Döcker, Terrasentyp“ (Buchbesprechung) in Das Neue Frankfurt, Frankfurt/ Main, September, 1930, 210.

Cetto, Max, “Sobre la feria de Nueva York“, Arquitectos México, No. 22, México,1965.

Cetto, Max, “Some Skeptical Remarks about Prophesying and Planning the Future of Architecture”, The Semester Review of the Clemson College of Architecture, Clemson, South Carolina, Spring 1971, 1-5

Cetto, Max, traducción al alemán y texto introductorio de Faber, Colin, Candela und seine Schalen, Callwey Verlag, München,1965

Cetto, Max, “Walter Gropius,“ Arquitectura Mexico, 102, México, Abril, 1970, 209–221. (Traducción del alemán a cargo de Bettina Cetto).

Cetto, Max, “Why Mexican Architecture is Different”, in Sergio Bath et al. Symposium on Latin America, Wellesley: Wellesley College, Barnette Miller Foundation, 1963, 143–161.

Cetto, Max, „Wohnbauten in einer Lavalandschaft Mexicos“ in Baukunst und Werkform, Heft 1–2, Frankfurt/Main, 1954, 37-58

== Works ==
1926/30 Various Works, including park pavilions, university dental clinic, teachers seminary, old people's asylum, electrical generating/transforming plants, etc., for the Frankfurt Building Office.

1927 League of Nations Building. Geneva (competition project: with Wolfgang Bangert).

1939 Hotel, San José Purúa, Mexico (with Jorge Rubio).

1945 Wolfgang Paalen Studio, San Angel, Mexico City.

1946 Villaseñor House. General Cano. Tacubaya, Mexico City.

1947 Quintana Weekend House, Lago de Tequesquitengo, Morelos, Mexico.

1948 Hill House, Guerrero 10, San Angel, Mexico City (with John Mc Andrew).

1949 Tamayo House, Leibnitz 248, Col. Anzures, Mexico City.

1949 Max Cetto House, Agua 130, Pedregal, Mexico City.

1950 Pedregal Show House, Fuentes 130, Mexico City (in collaboration with Luis Barragán).

1951 Berdecio House, Fuentes, Mexico City.

1952 Friedeberg House, Agua 330, Mexico City.

1953 Boehm House, Agua 737, Mexico City.

1954 Kirk House, Creston 232, Mexico City.

1955 Deutsch Weekend House Tepoztlán, Morelos, Mexico.

1956 Reforma Office Building, Reforma 114, Mexico City.

1956 Deutsch House, San Jeronimo, Mexico City.

1957 Krupenski House, Pirules 106, Mexico City.

1959 Vetter House, Picacho 239, Mexico City.

1960 Ehni House, Fuente de Diana 45, Tecamachalco, Mexico.

1961 Cold Rolled Company Workshop, Calz. Del Moral 186, Iztapalapa, Mexico.

1962 Novick House, Avenida 3, 43, Las Águilas Mexico City.

1963 Kirchhoff House, Juárez 18, Tlacopac, Mexico City.

1964 Crevenna House, Av. San Jeronimo 136, Mexico City.

1965 Ezquerro House, Cerro del Tesoro, Coyoacán, Mexico City.

1966 Sevilla House, Santiago 258, San Jeronimo, Mexico City.

1966 Moore House, Genung Road, Ithaca. New York.

1967/68 Morelos Tanning Company, Cuautla, Morelos, Mexico.

1968/71 Office Building, Obrero Mundial 629, Mexico City.

1970/79 German Club of Mexico, Aldama 153. Tepepan, Mexico.

1974 Strötgen House, San Diego de los Padres 51, Club de Golf Hacienda, Mexico.

1975 Cold Rolled Company Office Building, Calz. del Moral 186, Ixtapalapa, Mexico.

1977 Frenk Weekend House, Jiutepec, Morelos, Mexico.

1979 Brody House, Cerro del Agua 43, Mexico City.

== Archives ==
Max Cetto Archiv Frankfurt, Deutsches Architektur Museum Frankfurt.

Archivo Max Cetto, Universidad Autónoma Metropolitana, Azcapotzalco, México.

Max Cetto Papers, Getty Research Institute, Los Angeles.

McCoy, Esther, Esther McCoy Papers, 1920–1989. Archives of American Art, Smithsonian Institution, Washington, D.C.

== Sources ==
Dussel Peters, Susanne, Max Cetto Arquitecto mexicano-alemán, UAM Azcapotzalco, México, 1995

Ricalde, Humberto G., Max Cetto Vida y obra, UNAM, México, 2005

Cetto, Max, Modern Architecture in Mexico Arquitectura Moderna en México, Facsimile Edition, Museo de Arte Moderno, México, 2011

https://web.archive.org/web/20140714205106/http://www.arts-history.mx/semanario/especial.php?id_nota=17022012144057

== Literature ==
Aptilón, Alejandro and Alfonso Pérez-Méndez: Las Casas del Pedregal 1947-1968. Ed. Gustavo Gilli, Barcelona / México 2007.

Brockhoff, Evelyn: Zum Nachlaß von Max Cetto (1903–1980). In: Deutsches Architektur-Museum (Publishers): Architektur-Jahrbuch. München 1996, P. 178–183.

Canales, Fernanda: Arquitectura en México 1900-2010. Bilingual edition, 2 vols. Arquine/Banamex, México 2014.

Canales, Fernanda and Alejandro Hernández Gálvez: 100x100. Arquitectos del siglo XX en México. Arquine, México 2011.

Carranza, Luis and Fernando Luiz Lara: Modern Architecture in Latin America. Art, Technology and Utopia. University of Texas Press, USA 2014.

De Anda Alanís, Enrique X.: La casa Cetto en el Pedregal de San Ángel: Aire, rocas y recuerdos... En: Universidad de México (Revista de la Universidad Nacional Autónoma de México), Núm. 516-517 (ene-feb), pp. 44–48, México, 1994

Dias Comas, Carlos Eduardo and Miquel Adria: La Casa Latinoamericana Moderna. 20 paradigmas de mediados del siglo XX. Ed. Gustavo Gilli, Barcelona / México 2003.

Dussel Peters, Susanne: Max Cetto. Arquitecto mexicano-alemán. Universidad Autónoma Metropolitana Azcapotzalco, México 1995, ISBN 970-62-0719-8.

Dussel Peters, Susanne: "Die Architektur Hannes Meyers und Max Cettos. Von der deutschen Moderne nach Mexiko". In: Renata von Hanffstengel (Coord.): Mexiko. Das wohltemperierte Exil. Instituto de Investigaciones Interculturales Germano Mexicanas, México 1995, P. 233–252.

Eggener, Keith: Expressionism and Emotional Architecture in Mexico. Luis Barragán's Collaborations with Max Cetto and Mathias Goeritz. In: "Architectura, Journal of the History of Architecture", Nr. 25. Deutscher Kunstverlag, München / Berlin 1995, P. 77–94.

Escotto, Daniel: Max Cetto y la arquitectura de entreguerras. In: "Bitácora-Arquitectura", Nr. 9 (April–June 2003), P. 12–19.

Escotto, Daniel: Pesquisas sobre Max Cetto. In: "Piso, Ciudad al Ras", Nr. 6 (Autumn 2004), P. 28–35.

Garza Usabiaga, Daniel: Max Cetto. Protagonista del desarrollo de la arquitectura moderna en México. In: Max Cetto (†): Modern Architecture in Mexico. Arquitectura moderna en México. (Facsimile edition) Museo de Arte Moderno, México 2011.

Gómez, Lilia (Coord.): Entrevista con el Arquitecto Max L. Cetto. In: Testimonios Vivos. 20 Arquitectos (Cuadernos de Arquitectura y Conservación del Patrimonio Artístico, Mexico City 15.-16. September 1979?) INBA, México 1979.

Haskell, Douglas: Mexico's Pedregal Gardens. In: house + home No. 10 (octubre 1952), pp. 126–133, Time Inc., New York, 1952

Hegemann, Werner: Poelzig-Schüler. In: "Wasmuths Monatshefte für Baukunst und Städtebau", March edition, 1931, P. 100–105.

Henderson, Susan R. "Building Culture: Ernst May and the New Frankfurt, 1926-1932" (NY: Peter Lang, 2013).

Heredia, Juan Manuel: The Work of Max Cetto. Restorations of Topography and Disciplinarity in Twentieth Century Modern Architecture. Dissertation, University of Pennsylvania, 2008.

Heredia, Juan Manuel: Mexico and CIAM. Notes to Mexican Modern Architecture. In:"Bitácora-Arquitectura", Nr. 26, 27, México

Liernur, Jorge Francisco: The (Latin) American Friend. Architecture and European Exile South of the Rio Bravo 1936–1948. In: Bernd Nicolai (Coord.): Architektur und Exil. Kulturtransfer und architektonische Emigration von 1930 bis 1950. Porta Alba, Trier 2003, P. 157–167.

Lluvera, Angela: A citta del Messico un giardino succulento. En: La Mia Casa (Rivista di arrendamento, design, architettura, arte) No. 175, pp. 56–59, Italia, 1985

Noelle, Louise: Cetto, Max. In: Arquitectos Contemporáneos de México. Ed. Trillas, México 1989.

Ricalde, Humberto: Max Cetto. Vida y obra. Facultad de Arquitectura, Universidad Nacional Autónoma de México, México 2005.

Rodríguez Prampolini, Ida: Architect Max Cetto. In: Max Cetto (†): Modern Architecture in Mexico. Arquitectura moderna en México. (Facsimile edition) Museo de Arte Moderno, México 2011.

https://web.archive.org/web/20140714205106/http://www.arts-history.mx/semanario/especial.php?id_nota=17022012144057
