= Peterson Schools =

Location
- Multiple Locations; Distrito Federal; Mexico

Information
- Type: Private, Co-Ed, International
- Motto: Enriching Minds, Globalizing Lives
- Established: 1965
- Founder: Marvin & Leni Peterson
- Officer in charge: Kenneth Peterson
- Grades: Preschool - 12th grade
- Enrollment: 1883
- Campus: Cuajimalpa, Lomas, Paseo, Pedregal
- Colors: Blue, red and white
- Mascot: Peterson Vikings

The Peterson Schools (Spanish: Colegios Peterson) is a private, international, co-educational, non-profit establishment located in Mexico City, Mexico. It has offered the International Baccalaureate Organization Diploma Program since 2004 to students in the last two years of high school.

The Peterson Schools is a member of the Association of American Schools in Mexico (ASOMEX), of Instituciones de Enseñanza Particular de la República Mexicana (IEPRM), as well as member of National Association of Independent Schools (NAIS)

== Locations ==
The Cuajimalpa Campus in Lomas de Vista Hermosa, Cuajimalpa serves preschool through high school and was founded in 1990.

The Lomas Campus in Lomas de Chapultepec, Miguel Hidalgo it is the oldest Montessori English preschool in Mexico and was founded in 1965.

The Paseo Campus in Jardines del Pedregal, Álvaro Obregón teaches preschool and pre-first, and was opened in 2019.

The Pedregal Campus in Jardines del Pedregal, Álvaro Obregón serves elementary school and was founded in 1976.

Campuses in Mexico City

== See also ==
- American immigration to Mexico
