= Carlos Alberto Flores Gutiérrez =

Mexican politician

- Born: 13 July 1974 (age 51); Mexico City, Mexico
- Occupation: Politician
- Political party: PAN

Carlos Alberto Flores Gutiérrez (born 13 July 1974) is a Mexican politician from the National Action Party (PAN). From 2000 to 2003 he served as a federal deputy in the 58th Congress, representing the Federal District's sixteenth district.
