= Colegio Francés del Pedregal =

Private school in Mexico City

Colegio Francés del Pedregal is a private school in Jardines del Pedregal, Álvaro Obregón, Mexico City, serving preschool through senior high school (preparatoria). It was founded by Madame Marie Flavie Arnaud in 1903.

== History ==
The school started as an exclusively female school for girls of French origin. It was originally located in Santa Maria de la Ribera. It was founded by nuns from the Catholic congregation of St. Joseph of Lyon, France, called upon by Marist Brothers to establish an educational institution in Mexico.
