= Instituto Oxford =

Instituto Oxford is a private school in Colonia Torres del Potrero, Álvaro Obregón, Mexico City. The school offers preschool through senior high school (bachillerato). It is a branch of the catholic school program of Universidad Anáhuac.
