= Colegio Alexander Bain =

Private school system in Mexico

Colegio Alexander Bain is a private school system in Mexico. Its junior-senior high school program is Bachillerato Alexander Bain, S.C., located in Tlacopac, San Ángel, Álvaro Obregón, Mexico City. It also operates the Colegio Alexander Bain, a preschool and primary school in Tlacopac; Instituto Alexander Bain (IAB) in Pedregal de San Ángel in Álvaro Obregón, serving preschool and primary school; and the Alexander Bain Irapuato (ABI) school in Irapuato, Guanajuato, serving preschool through junior high school (secundaria).

There is also the Escuela Alexander Bain in Álvaro Obregón; it was affiliated with the other Bain schools until circa 2006. It is adjacent to the Colegio Alexander Bain.

The system was named after a Scotsman, Alexander Bain.

As of 2016 Sergio Rivero Beneitez, the son of the founder of the bachillerato, María Luisa Beneitez Brown, is the director of that school.

== History ==
The first school, Escuela Alexander Brown, opened in 1956. In 1964 it moved to its current location.

María Luisa Beneitez Brown opened the bachillerato in 1972, and it began using the UNAM educational program that year.

Instituto Alexander Bain opened in 1975. Mrs. Ofelia Arriaga de Nájera was the first director. She is the sister of the school's founder.

On May 8, 1990, the bachillerato began using the International Baccalaureate Diploma program, and on December 20, 2000, it began using the Middle Years Program.

As of 1995 the bachillerato campus had 16 teachers. That year the colegio opened.

Around 2006 the children of the founders took control of the schools and began a legal conflict. The owner of the Escuela Alexander Bains filed a lawsuit to keep the name.

The Irapuato campus opened in 2006.

In 2016 an issue between the building and the owners of Colegio Alexander Bain (Barranca de Pilares) caused it to temporarily close. The school was evicted from the premises due to the longstanding legal conflict.

== Campus ==
As of 1995 its bachillerato campus in Mexico City has a library, one computer lab, one projection room, a soccer (football) field, a basketball field, eight volleyball fields, an auditorium, six wings, and two workshops.

Bachillerato:

- Silvia Vargas, daughter of Mexican federal government official Neson Vargas - At age 18 she was kidnapped on the way to school and later murdered
