= Colonia Florida =

Florida
- Neighborhood of Mexico City
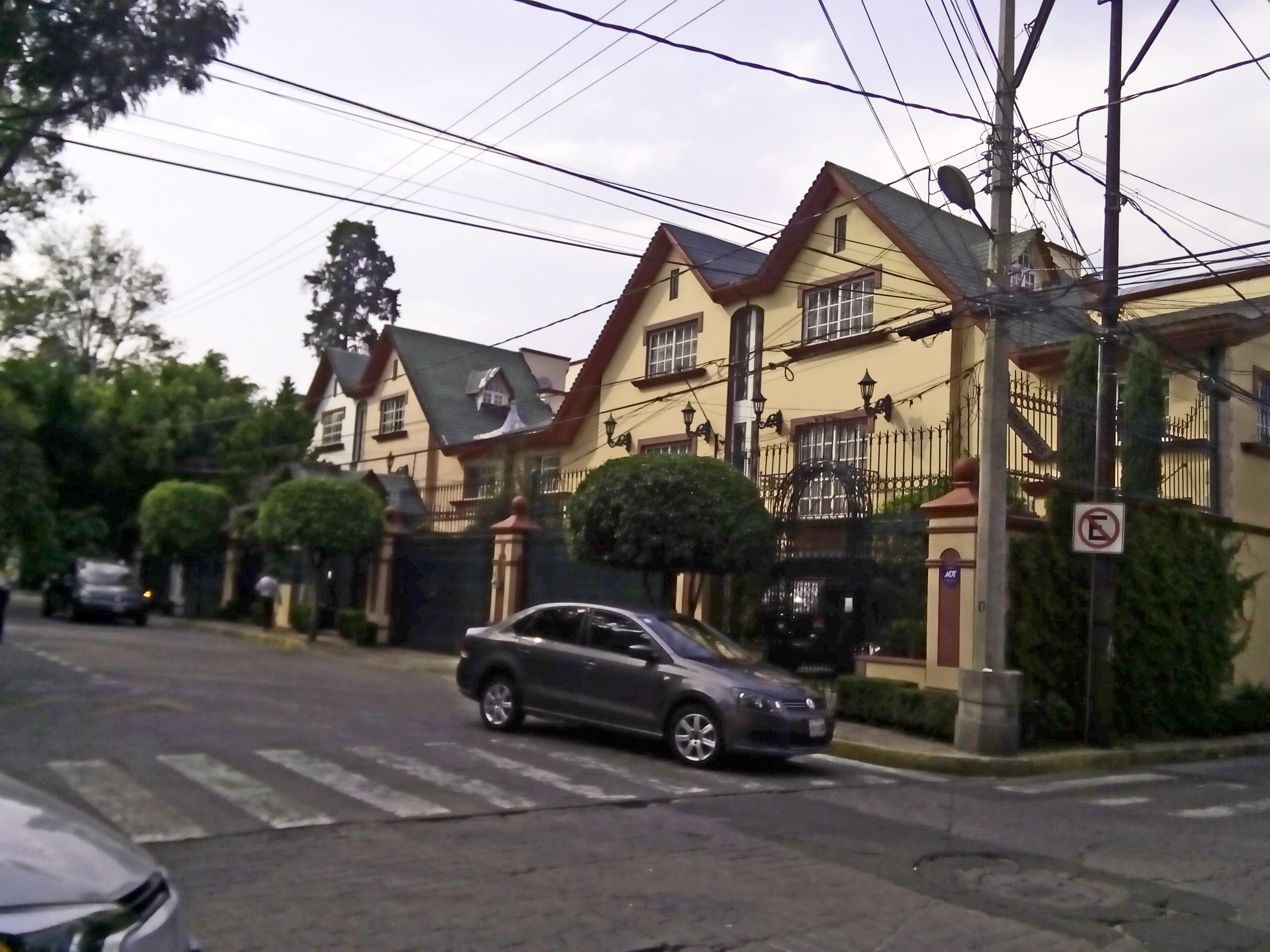
- Francia street with its typical alpine-inspired houses
- Country: Mexico
- City: Mexico City
- Borough: Álvaro Obregón
- Postal code: 01030

Colonia Florida is a neighborhood in Mexico City, located in the Álvaro Obregón borough.

== Location ==
Colonia Florida is located in the Álvaro Obregón borough, in southern Mexico City.

The neighborhood is bordered by:

- Barranca del Muerto to the north, across which is Colonia Crédito Constructor in the Benito Juárez borough.
- Avenida de los Insurgentes Sur to the west, across which is Guadalupe Inn
- Vito Alessio Robles street to the south, across which is Chimalistac
- Manzano, Iztaccihuátl, Moras, Minerva and Hortensia streets to the east, across which is Axotla

== History ==
Colonia Florida was developed in the 1950s, alongside Guadalupe Inn around the core of the village of Axotla, in lands that belonged to the Hacienda de Guadalupe.

Due to this fact, there is a particular feature in this neighborhood. Originally, Colonia Florida had cobblestoned street, nevertheless, this was substituted by irregular concrete, such as in the Historic center.

== Street nomenclature ==
The streets in the neighborhood have names of flowers and fruits such as Hortensia, Olivo and Mango, Moras; Mexican mountains such as Iztaccihuátl and Ajusco. There are, nevertheless, streets whose names do not match this criterion, such as Minerva street, Patricio Sainz street and Francia street. Francia street name derives from the Club France, a sports club founded in 1928 by Frenchman Charles Tardan, which is located in that street.

== Transportation ==
=== Public transportation ===
The area is served by the Mexico City Metrobús.

Metrobus stations

- José Maria Velasco
- Francia
- Olivo
- Altavista
