= Colegio Princeton de México =

Private school in Mexico City

Coordinates: 25.74803°N 100.28401°W

Information
- Other name: Colegio Princeton del Sur S.C.
- Established: 1980s
- Founder: Katia Arakelian
- Closed: March 11, 2020

Colegio Princeton del Sur S.C., which operated as Colegio Princeton de México, was a private school in Mexico City. It had its kindergarten and primary school campuses in Jardines del Pedregal, Álvaro Obregón, and its junior and senior high school (secundaria y bachillerato) campus in Heroes de Padierna, Tlalpan. It had no affiliation nor any accreditation from Princeton University and that university's board of trustees.

Katia Arakelian established the school in the 1980s. The first campus was the Av. de las Fuentes 218 building.

It closed on March 11, 2020.
