= Valentina Batres Guadarrama =

Mexican politician

- Born: 26 May 1971 (age 54); Mexico City, Mexico
- Occupation: Politician
- Political party: PRD (1989–2013); MRN (2014–)

Valentina Batres Guadarrama (born 26 May 1971) is a Mexican politician affiliated with the National Regeneration Movement (Morena) who was previously a member of the Party of the Democratic Revolution (PRD). In 2006–2009 she served as a federal deputy in the 60th Congress, representing the Federal District's sixteenth district for the PRD.

She is a sister to Martí Batres Guadarrama (mayor of Mexico City in 2023–2024) and Lenia Batres Guadarrama (justice of the Supreme Court since 2023).
