= Víctor Suárez Carrera =

Mexican politician (born 1952)

Member of the Chamber of Deputies for the Federal District's 16th district
- In office 1 September 2003 – 31 August 2006

Personal details
- Born: 16 September 1952 (age 73) Mexico City, Mexico
- Party: PRD
- Education: Chapingo Autonomous University

Víctor Suárez Carrera (born 16 September 1952) is a Mexican politician affiliated with the Party of the Democratic Revolution (PRD). In 2003–2006 he served as a federal deputy in the 59th Congress, representing the Federal District's sixteenth district for the PRD.
