= Jardines del Pedregal =

Neighbourhood in Mexico City

Coordinates: 19.320575°N 99.20929°W

Jardines del Pedregal (English: Rocky Gardens) or simply El Pedregal (full name: El Pedregal de San Angel) is an upscale residential colonia (neighborhood) in southern Mexico City hosting some of the richest families of Mexico. It is also known as the home to the biggest mansion in the city. Its borders are San Jerónimo Avenue and Ciudad Universitaria to the north, Insurgentes Avenue to the east and Periférico to the south and west. Its 510 hectares (1,250 acres) were a major real estate project undertaken by Mexican modernist architect Luis Barragán.

When it was originally developed, in the mid-1940s in the lava fields of the Pedregal de San Ángel, it was probably the biggest urban development the city had seen. The first house to be built here was the studio and home of architect Max Cetto.

The area has changed significantly since its original development. Although its modernist spirit and original elements of ecosystem protection are gone, critics have described its original houses and gardens as a turning point in Mexican architecture. Some of the old modernist houses have been catalogued as part of Mexico's national patrimony.

== History ==
The Pedregal lava fields were formed by the eruption of the Xitle volcano around 5000 BC, but there are documented eruptions until 400 AD.

The area near what is currently el Pedregal, called Cuicuilco, has been inhabited since ca. 1700 BC. Around 300 BC, the area contained what was probably the biggest city in the Valley of Mexico at the time. Its importance started to decline around the 100 BC and was completely empty by 400 AD.

== Urban development ==
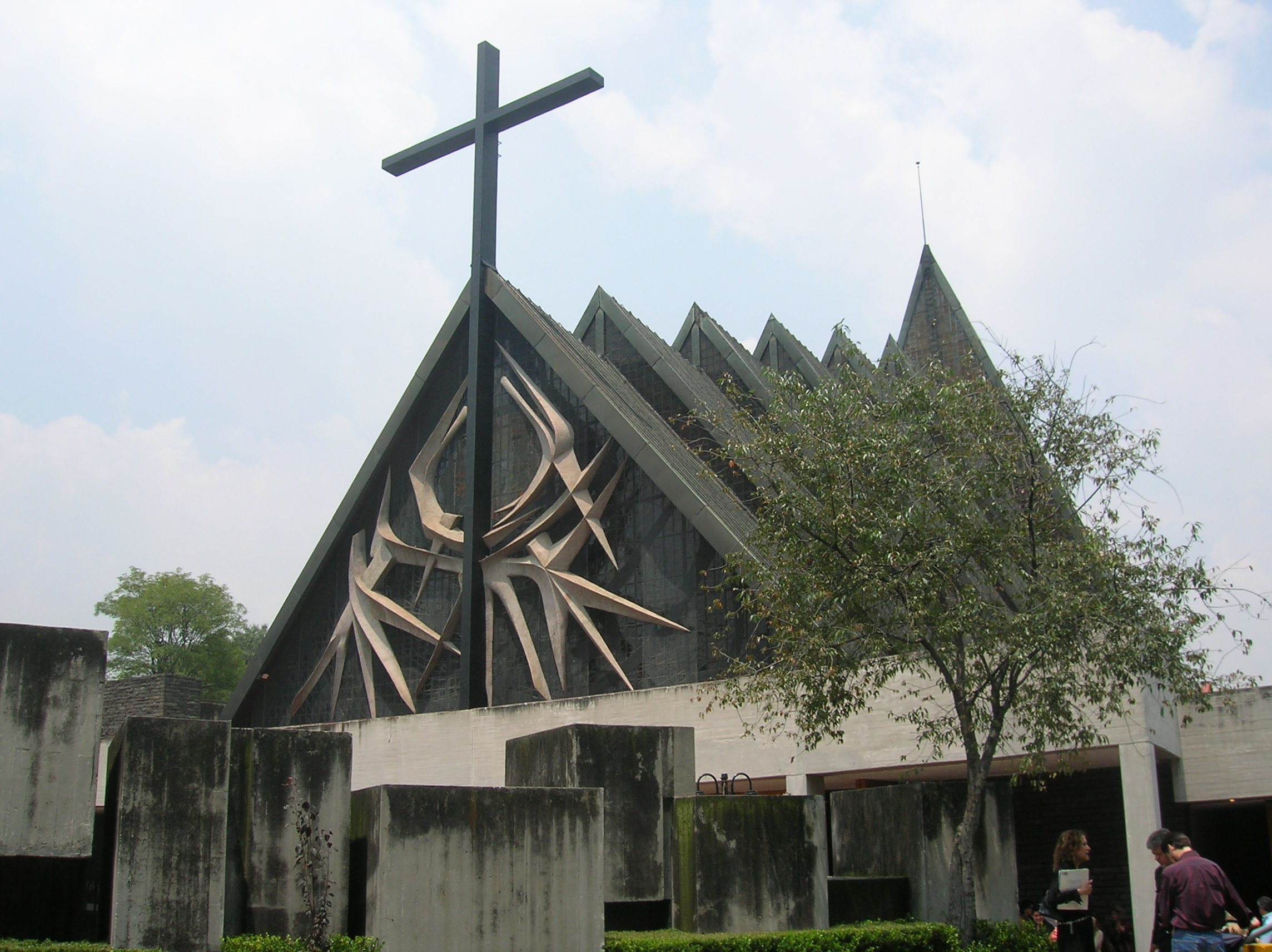
Church of Santa Cruz del Pedregal

In the mid-1940s Luis Barragán began a project to urbanize the area and protect its ecosystem. Barragán had the idea of developing El Pedregal promoting the harmony between architecture and landscape. The first structures built on the site were the Plaza de las Fuentes, or Plaza of the Fountains, the demonstration gardens and demonstration houses by Barragán and Max Cetto. Other famous architects that contributed to the development of Pedregal include: Francisco Artigas, Manuel Parra, Enrique Castañeda Tamborrell, José María Buendía, Antonio Attolini, Fernando Ponce Pino, Óscar Urrutia, and Manuel Rosen.“Los Jardines del Pedregal de San Ángel, un legado de la modernidad arquitectónica 1947-1962”

=== Plaza de las Fuentes ===
El Pedregal's original main entrance, the Plaza de las Fuentes, was completed by the second half of 1949, and was located at the intersection of Fuentes and San Jerónimo avenues. The only remaining element of the plaza is the magnificent concrete Animal del Pedregal a sculpture by Mathias Goeritz, inspired by a prehistoric animal figure etched into the rocks of the Pedregal.

=== Model Gardens and Casas Muestra ===
The Model Gardens were designed by Luis Barragán for public inspection and planned as models for the development of private space.

The Casas Muestra were intended for publicity and sales purposes. The first one was built in 1950 according to the project by Max Cetto in collaboration with Luis Barragán (Av. Fuentes 130). Next to it, on Av. Las Fuentes 140, followed the home acquired by the painter Roberto Berdecio and designed by Max Cetto in 1951. Along with these residences, the Model Gardens were intended to entice prospective buyers and demonstrate the Pedregal's potential as a site for garden-homes. They were to illustrate Barragán's idea of correct building, promoting the sort of harmony between architecture and landscape that Barragán desired. Occupying about 7.4 acres (30,000 m^{2}), these gardens were enclosed by volcanic-stone walls and iron fences and entered through metal or rough-hewn wood gates.

During summer evenings in the 1950s, classic Spanish plays, produced by Barragán and the painter and sculptor Juan Soriano, were performed here for the general public.

== Today ==
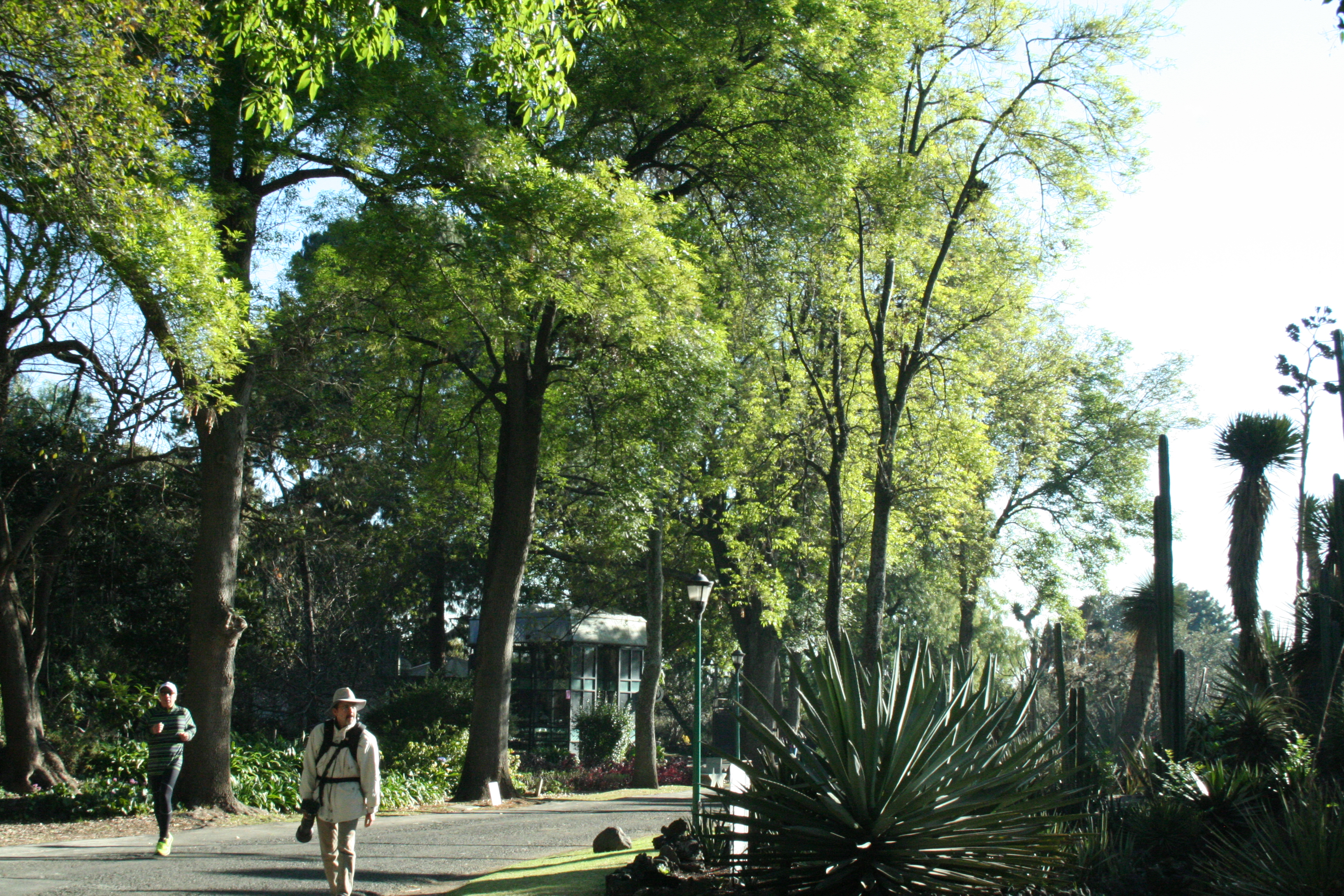
UNAM botanical garden

Although some of the original modernist residences still remain a lot of the original architecture has been substituted by more ostentatious structures. Because the original houses were built in large plots, some have been converted to horizontal condominiums or now house schools.

The Plaza de las Fuentes has been almost completely destroyed and large new office buildings now crowd it on either side, it is no longer the main entrance but just an exit street from El Pedregal.

== Education ==
Private schools:

- Colegio Peterson - A Mexican/American school runs a K-6 campus in the area w/ Montessori Kindergarten
- Liceo Mexicano Japonés, the Japanese educational school of Mexico City, is located in Jardines del Pedregal.
- The Colegio Alemán Alexander von Humboldt operates the Plantel Pedregal, which has Kindergarten classes, as part of the Campus Sur/Campus Süd (formerly Campus Xochimilco).
- Colegio Princeton has its kindergarten and primary school campuses in Pedregal.
- Colegio Francés del Pedregal
- Vermont School Plantel Pedregal
- Instituto Alexander Bain
- Preparatoria Universidad La Salle - Unidad Santa Teresa.

== Commercial area along Periférico ==
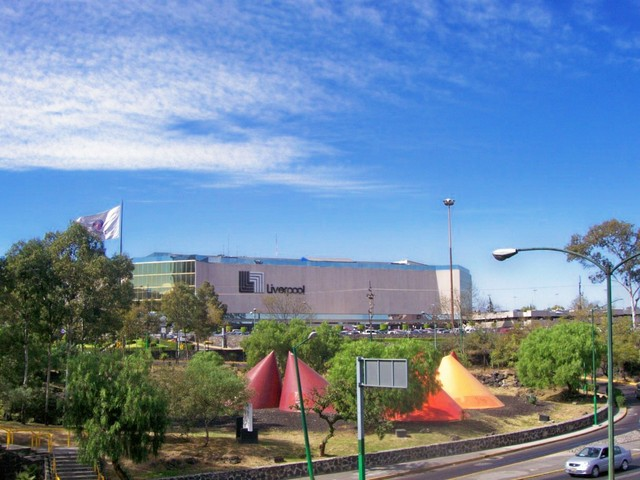
Perisur

One of the city's main suburban commercial, office and retail districts lines the Anillo Periférico freeway in and around Jardines del Pedregal. It and surrounding neighborhoods, many of which have "Pedregal" in their names, are generally referred to as the "Pedregal" area of the city.

Retail centers include:

- Artz Pedregal, Jardines del Pedregal, mixed-use development including a major luxury goods-focused shopping center, opened in 2018 along the Anillo Periférico freeway. Part of the mall collapsed and was rebuilt.
- Best Buy Periférico Sur
- Perisur regional shopping mall, with Liverpool, Palacio de Hierro and Sears (Mexico), and an adjacent Walmart

Other facilities include:

- Camino Real Pedregal hotel
- Hotel Pedregal Palace
- Colegio de México university
- ESPN Mexico studios
- Hospital Ángeles del Pedregal, a major hospital on the other side of Periférico in the Héroes de Padierna neighborhood
- Hospital Central Sur de Alta Especialidad PEMEX
- TV Azteca – headquarters and studios of one of the world's largest Spanish-language television networks
- Audi, Toyota, KIA, and Mazda dealerships
