= Yolani Batres =

Honduran politician

Minister of Health
- Incumbent
- Assumed office 27 January 2014

Personal details
- Born: 14 January 1967 (age 59)

Edna Yolani Batres (born 14 January 1967) is a Honduran politician who was the Secretary of State at the Bureau of Health in the government of President Juan Orlando Hernández from January 2014 until December 2016.

== Career ==
Early career roles have included consultant at the Inter-American Development Bank, working on technical capacity building to support the expansion and sustainability of health services delivery within the Unit of Decentralised Management at the Secretariat of Health.

Before her appointment as Secretary of State, Batres served as the Deputy Secretary of Health for Service Networks; Head of the Unit for Coverage Expansion for the Health Region of Gracias, Lempira; and Chief of the Emergency Services at the Departmental Hospital Juan Manuel Gálvez. During her time as Secretary of State, she oversaw the government's response to the 2015–16 Zika virus epidemic.

== Other activities ==
- Gavi, Member of the Board
