= Eugenio Batres Garcia =

Nicaraguan writer

Eugenio Batres
- Born: May 21, 1941 (age 85); Chinandega, Nicaragua
- Occupations: journalist, author, novelist
- Writing career
- Period: 1960–2007
- Genres: Nicaraguan and Latin American Studies
- Subjects: Political, Social and Economics History

Victor Eugenio Batres Garcia (born May 21, 1941 in Chinandega, Nicaragua) is a Nicaraguan journalist, political commentator, newscaster and writer. He is the author of "Subdesarrollo y corrupción: experencias tercermundistas de la democracia nicaragüense", published in 2003, a historical account of Nicaraguan governments.

== Early life ==
Eugenio Batres Garcia, born in 1941, became one of Nicaragua's most famed and respected journalists in the early 1960s. He began his political analysis and commentaries in weekly gazettes and local newspapers. In 1970, he became the country's first anchorman of a daily newscast program.
