= Instituto Miguel Ángel de Occidente =

Instituto Miguel Ángel de Occidente A.C. (IMAO) is a private school in Zapopan, Jalisco, Mexico, in the Guadalajara metropolitan area. It serves preschool through senior high school (preparatoria).

It was founded in 2001 by the Congregación de las Hermanas de la Caridad del Verbo Encarnado.

It is affiliated with the Instituto Miguel Ángel in Mexico City.
