= Álvaro Obregón, Mexico City =

Álvaro Obregón
- Borough
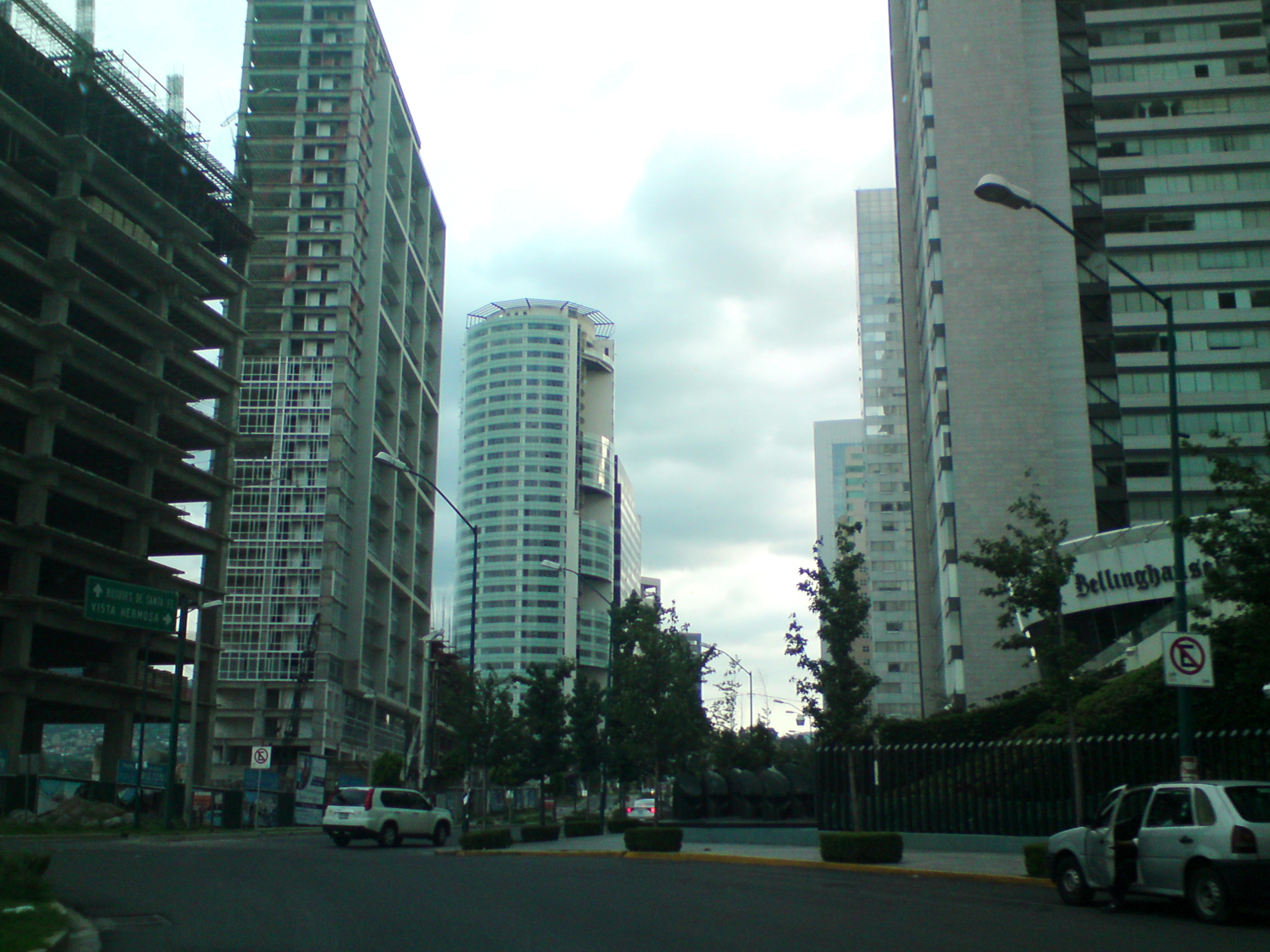
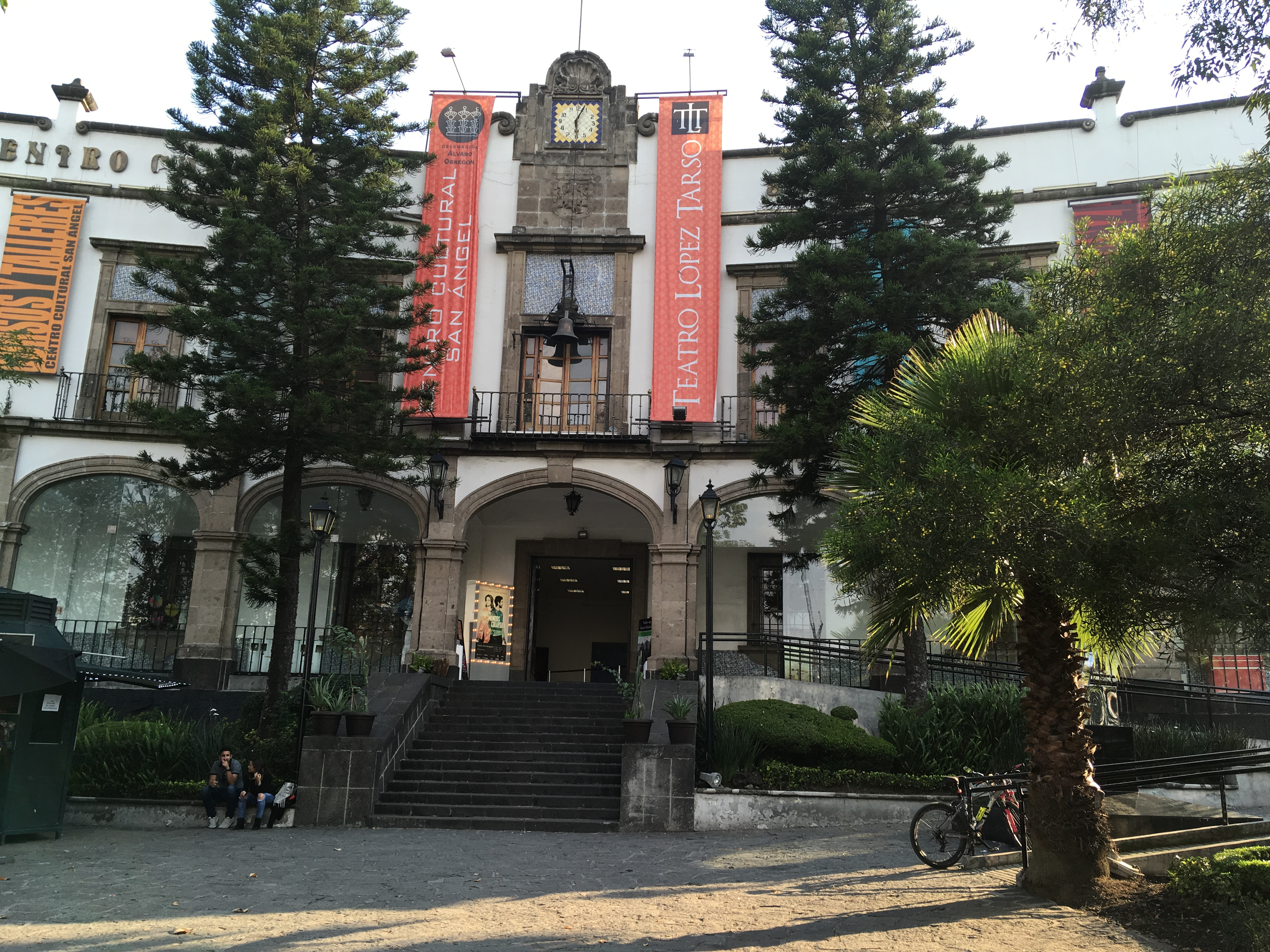
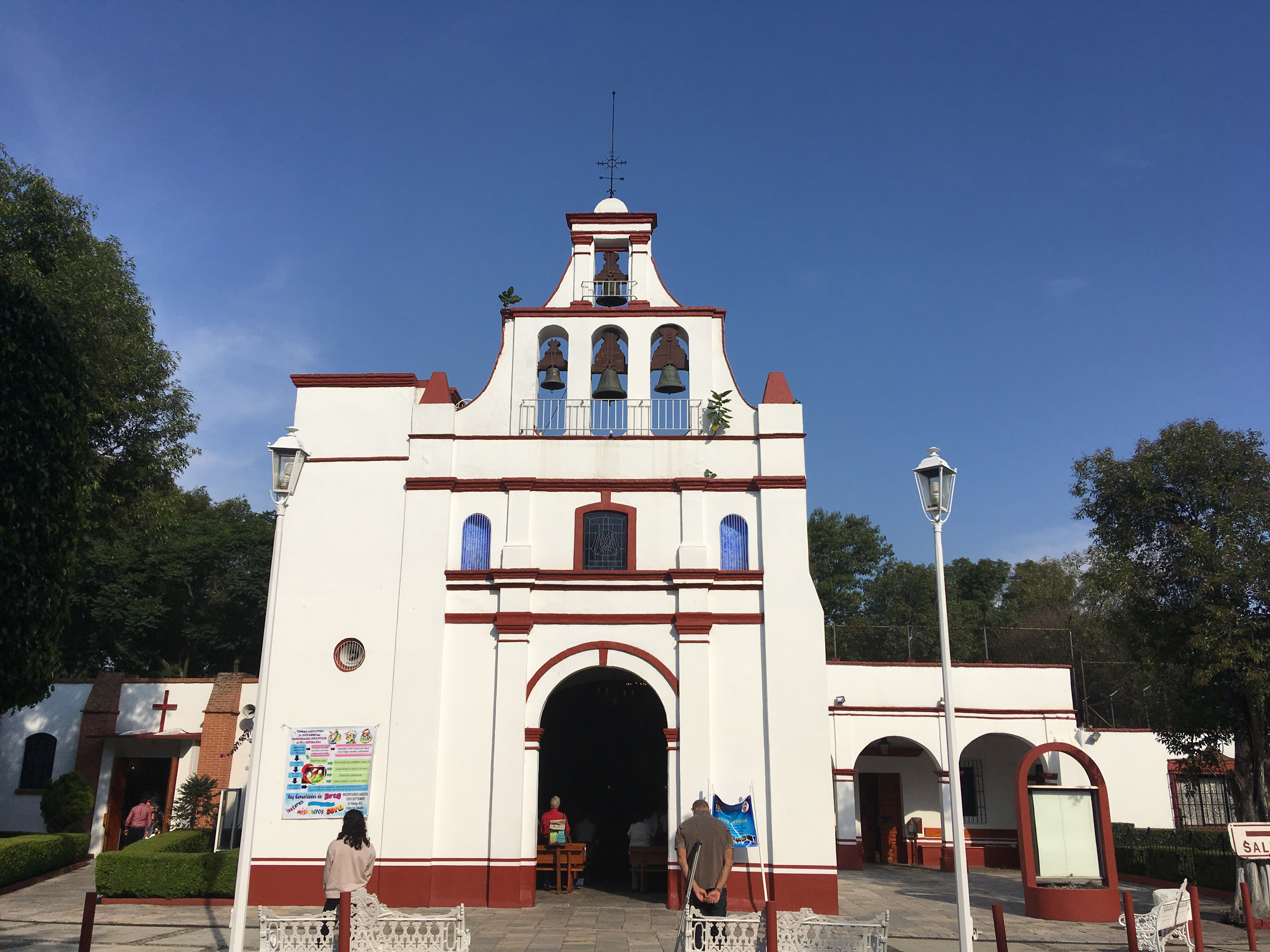
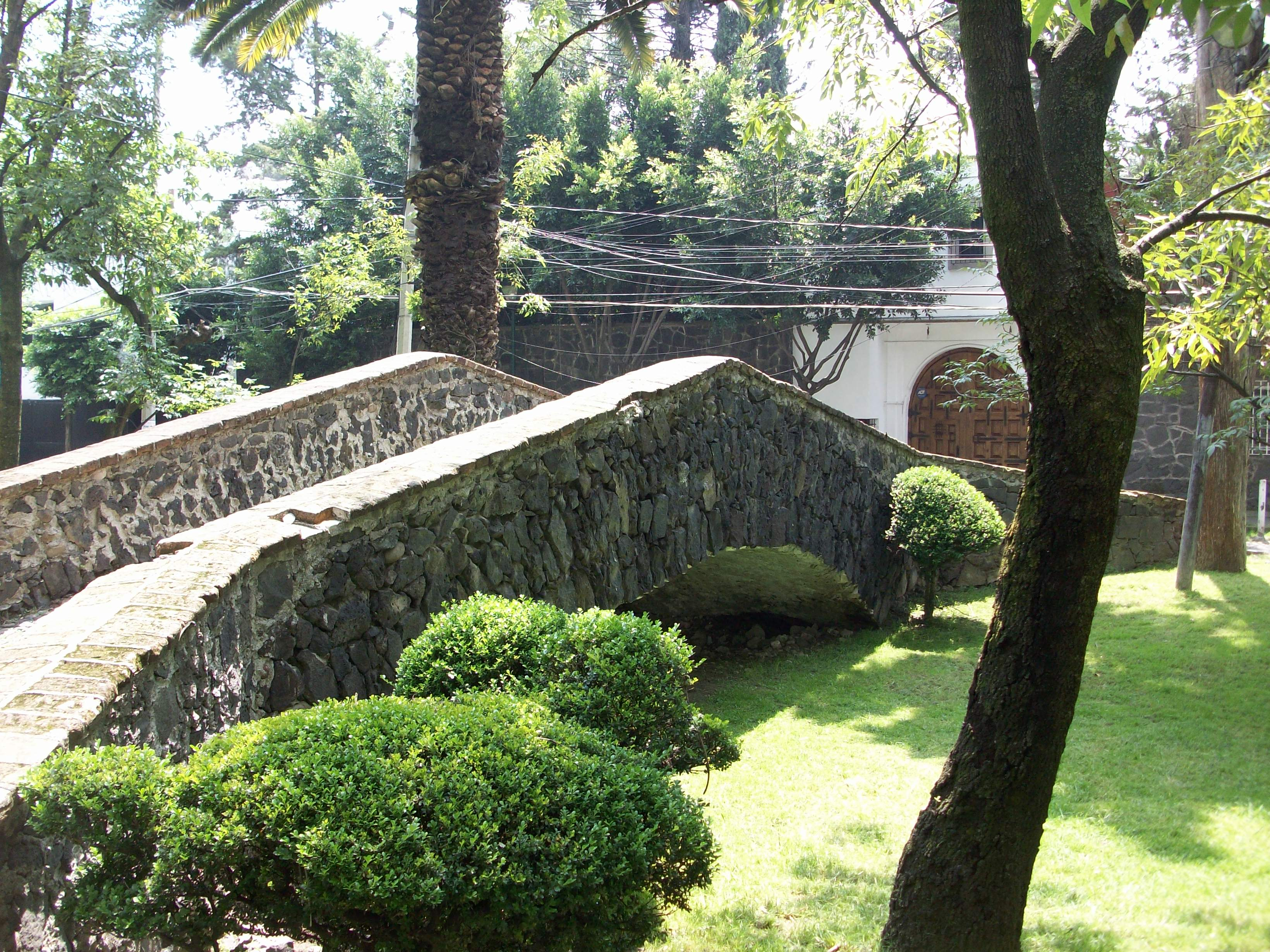
- Top: Santa Fe economic district; Middle: Former Municipal Palace, La Marquesa Park, Parish of Purísima Concepción Tlacopac; Bottom: Chimalistac Park, Murano Towers

- Seal

- Álvaro Obregón within Mexico City
- Coordinates: 19°21′23″N 99°14′10″W
- Country: Mexico
- Federal entity: Mexico City
- Established: 1928
- Named for: Álvaro Obregón
- Seat: Prolongación Calle 10 Col. Cristo Rey

Government
  - Mayor: Javier López Casarín (PVEM)
  - Federal electoral districts: CDMX-06, CDMX-16, CDMX-17

Area
  - Total: 96.39 km^{2} (37.22 sq mi)
- Elevation: 2,373 m (7,785 ft)
- Highest elevation: 3,820 m (12,530 ft)
- Lowest elevation: 2,260 m (7,410 ft)

Population (2020)
  - Total: 759,137
  - Density: 7,876/km^{2} (20,400/sq mi)
- Time zone: UTC-6 (Zona Centro)
- Postal codes: 01000 – 01990
- Area code: 55
- HDI (2020): ▲0.812 Very High
- Website: aao.cdmx.gob.mx

Álvaro Obregón (Spanish pronunciation: [ˈalβaɾo oβɾeˈɣon]) is a borough (demarcación territorial) in Mexico City. It contains a large portion of the south-west part of Mexico City. It had a 2020 census population of 759,137 inhabitants and lies at an elevation of 2,319 m. above sea level.

It was named after Álvaro Obregón, a leader of the Mexican Revolution and an early-20th-century Mexican president, who was assassinated in this area. Its former name is San Ángel, and the historic San Ángel neighborhood still retains this name, as does the Televisa San Angel motion picture and television studio, which is located in this municipality, which also includes the well-known upscale commercial neighborhoods Santa Fe, Jardines del Pedregal as well as Colonia Florida.

== Geography ==
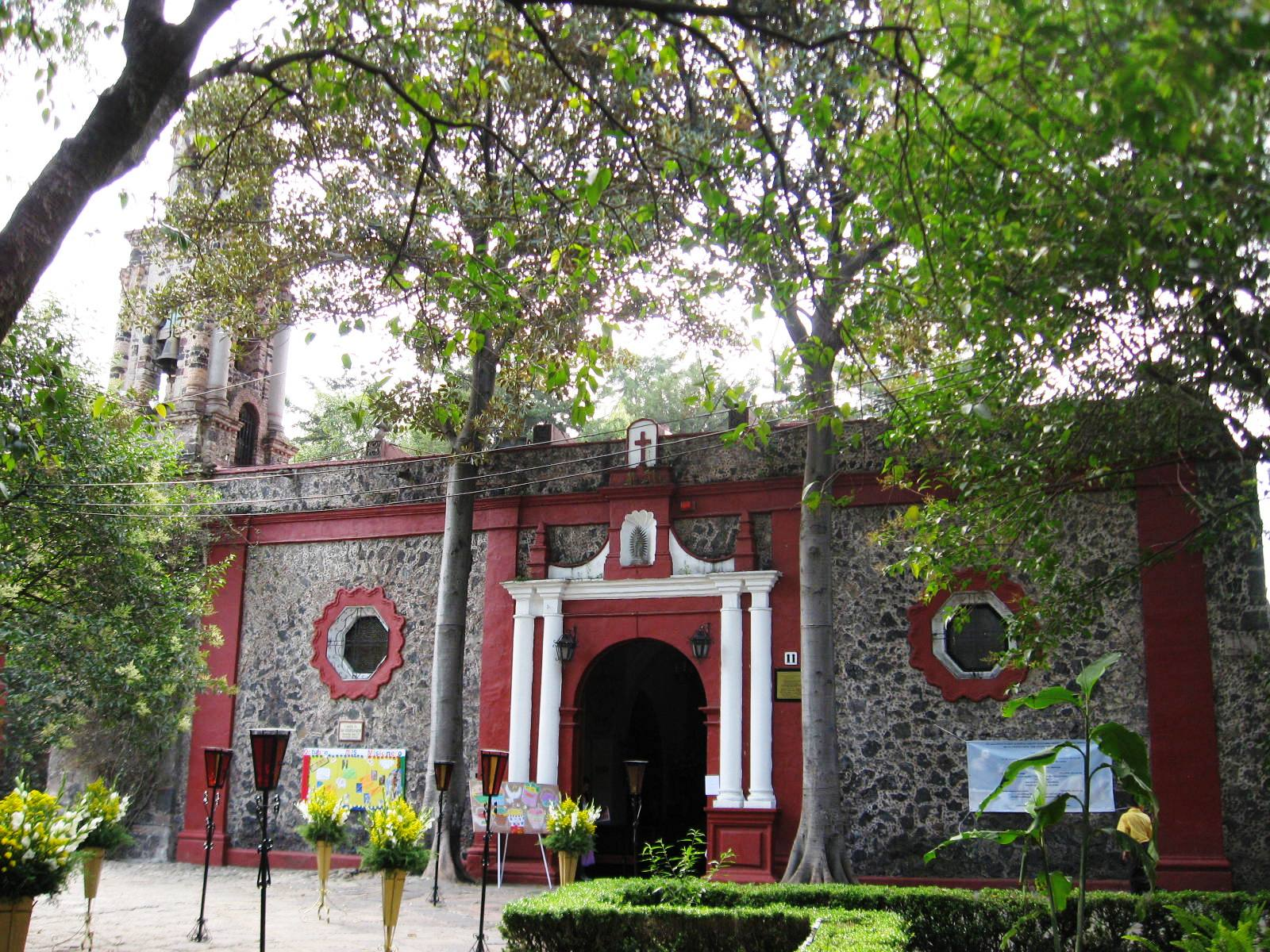
Church in Colonia Chimalistac

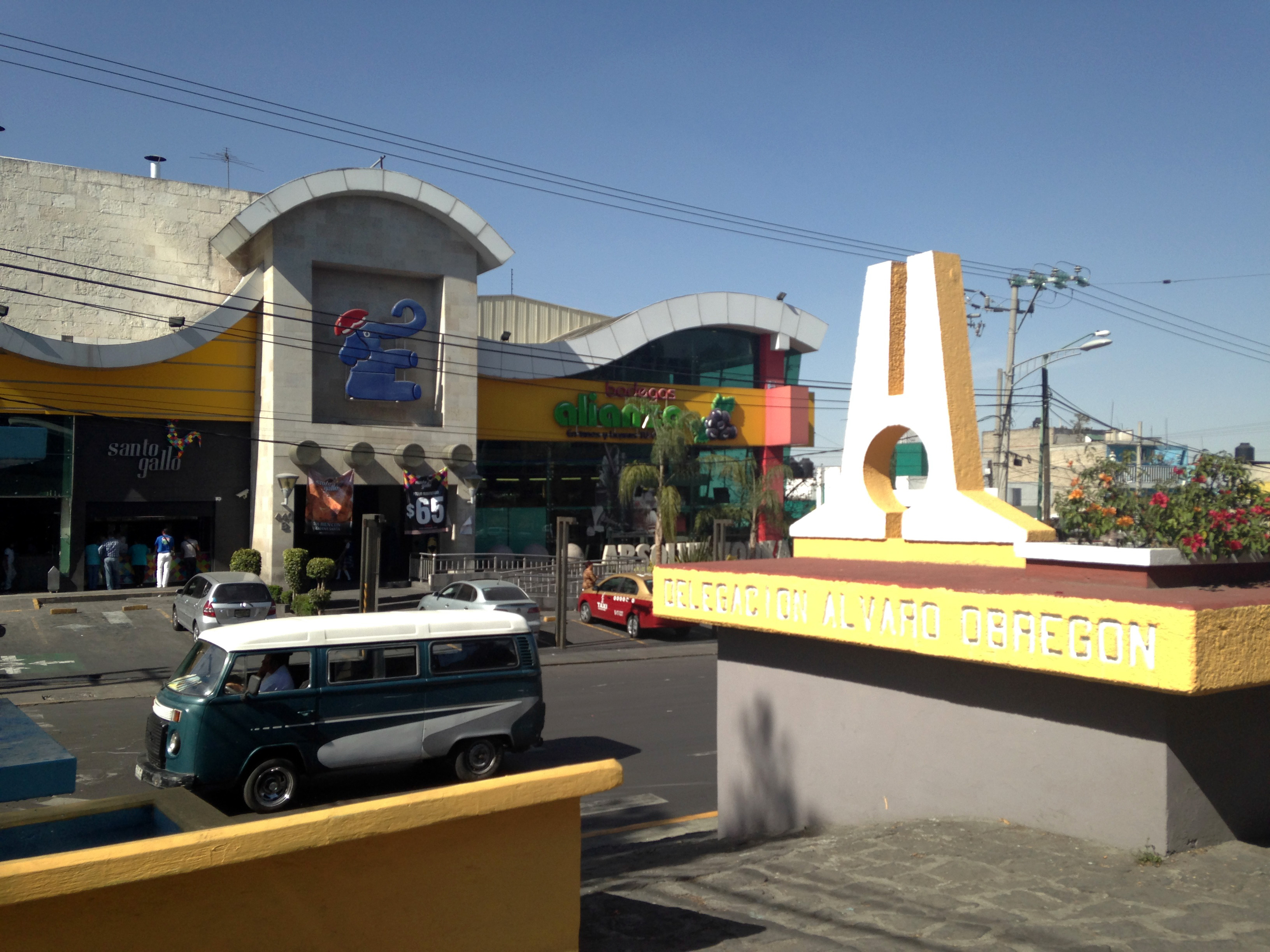
Vasco de Quiroga Av. in Álvaro Obregón, with the former icon of the delegación

The municipality of Álvaro Obregón is located in the west of Mexico City, and has a land surface of 96.17 km^{2}, with an elongated shape from northeast to southwest.

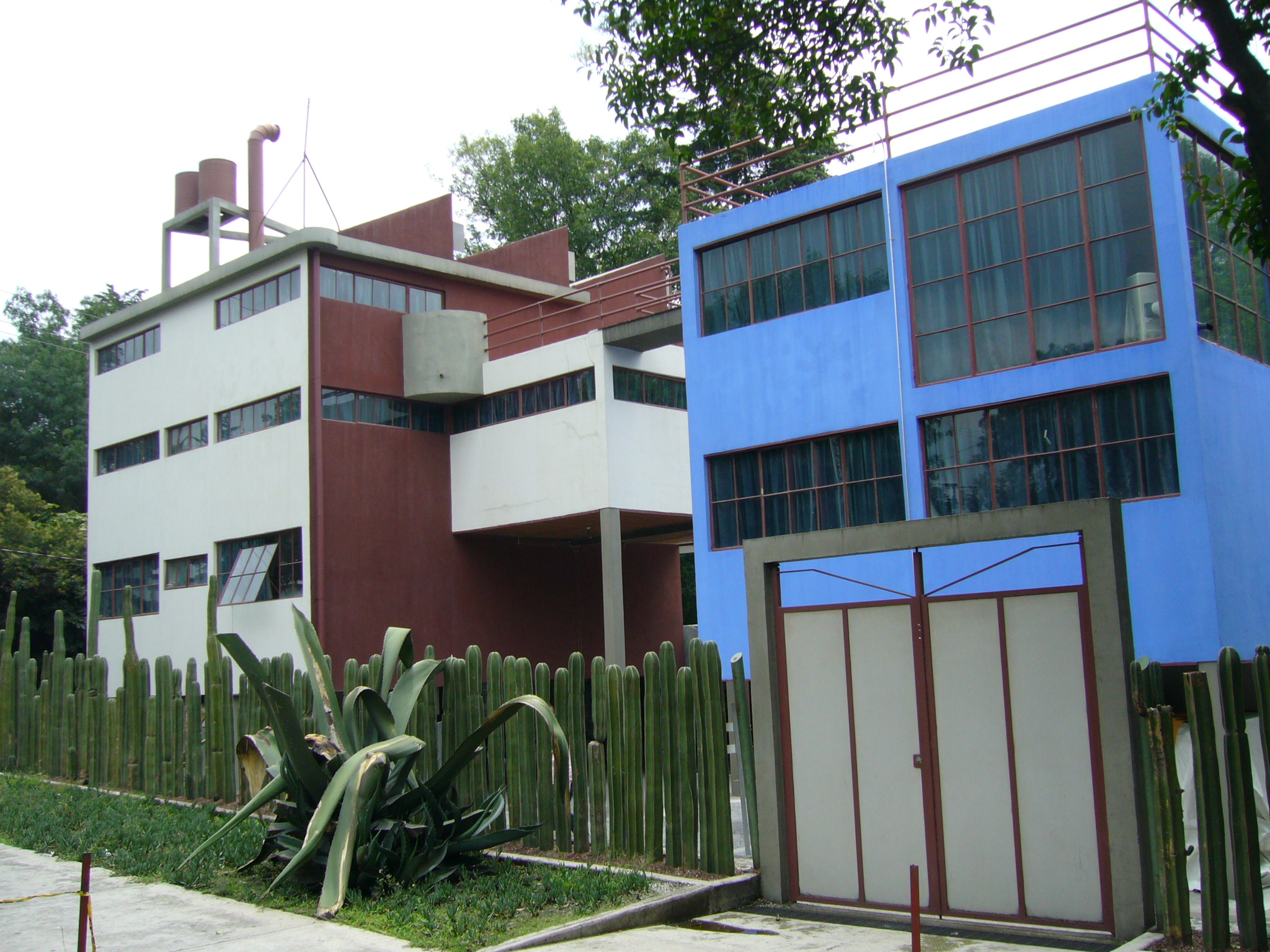
Diego Rivera and Frida Kahlo museum studio.

It borders Miguel Hidalgo to the North, Benito Juárez and Coyoacán to the East, Magdalena Contreras, Tlalpan and Jalatlacalco municipality (State of Mexico) to the South, and Cuajimalpa to the West. Together with Álvaro Obregón becomes the Western access to the city, and its regional roadways are the Federal Highway and the Freeway, which constitute the entry for merchandise and population from the states of Mexico and Michoacán.

The borough's maximum height is 3,820 meters above sea level at the summit of Triangulo mountain, and the lowest is at 2,260 meters. The borough occupies 7,720 hectares, or 6.28% of the Federal District area, and it has the fifth place in terms of territory of all municipalities. Of such hectares, 5,052 are urban soil and 2,668 are considered protected soil (66.1% and 33.8% respectively). Other important elevations (in meters) are the San Miguel mountain (3,780); the Cruz de Colica o Alcalica mountain (3,610); the Temamatla mountain (3,500); the Ocotal (3,450) and the Zacazontetla (3,270). In general, the relief is of great contrasts, constituted by surfaces of piedmont, product of the natural erosion of the mountain chain.

It is geographically located between the parallels 19°; 14'N and 19°; 25'N and the meridians 99°; 10' W and 99°; 20'0 W.

=== Edaphology ===
In the borough 4 types of soils dominate:

1. Haplic and Luvic Phaeozem: Cover 53.8% of the borough's territory; it is a soil that presents a normal sequence in its horizons, and a maximum thickness of 100 cm, developing between 2,500 and 3,000 meters above sea level.
2. Haplic Litosols: Are from a rocky volcanic origin, with a maximum thickness of 30 cm, covering 28.8% of the municipality, are located between 2,300 and 2,500 meters in altitude.
3. Andosols: Occupying 21.1% of the borough's land area; are rich in volcanic materials, dark superficial horizons, and have a maximum thickness of 50 cm. Their texture is medium and are located between 3,000 and 3,800 meters, and constitute the maximum altitude of the municipality.
4. Eutric Regosol: Occupying 1.9% of the borough's land area; are soils from a volcanic origin or from meiotic accumulation, little compacted and have a maximum thickness of 30 cm; they present thick texture and brown color.

=== Climate ===
For the region of San Ángel, Mixcoac, Tacubaya and adjacent areas around 2240 meters above sea level and up to 2,410, the climate is consistently mild with cool mornings and wetter than in Mexico City's downtown, averaging 15.5 °C (59.9 °F) and 943.1 mm (37.13 in) of rainfall yearly. The monthly temperature is warmest from April through June, reaching 17 °C (63 °F), whilst the lowest median temperatures occur from December through February reaching 13 °C (55 °F). Between 2,410 up to 3,100 meters above sea level the median temperature of the warmest months gets reduced to between 14.9 and 17.1 °C (58.8 and 62.8 °F) also from April through June. The minimum median temperatures (December–February) are cooler at 10 °C (50 °F). Precipitation here ranges between 1,000 and 1,200 mm (39 and 47 in) annually.

At higher elevations or in more forested areas temperatures cool down but precipitation rises. For instance even though the Desierto de los Leones National Park can reach above 3000 meters above sea level, at only 2220 meters the forest has a much cooler weather than the above-mentioned neighborhoods. The median temperature here drops to 10.6 °C (51.1 °F) and precipitation averages 1,324 mm (52.1 in). All regions of the municipality experience the highest rainfall from June through September and the lowest from November through February.

The climate charts illustrate the differences between two regions within Álvaro Obregón.

=== Flora and fauna ===
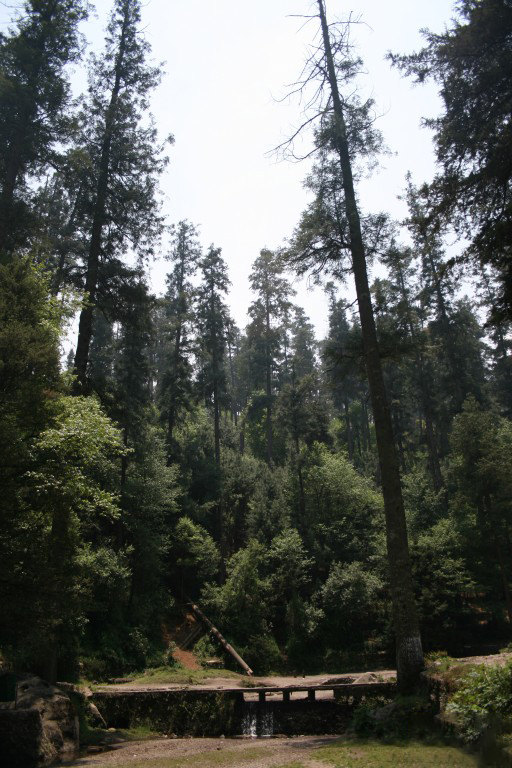
Desierto de los Leones National Park

The flora and fauna of the borough of Álvaro Obregón developed during prehistoric times.

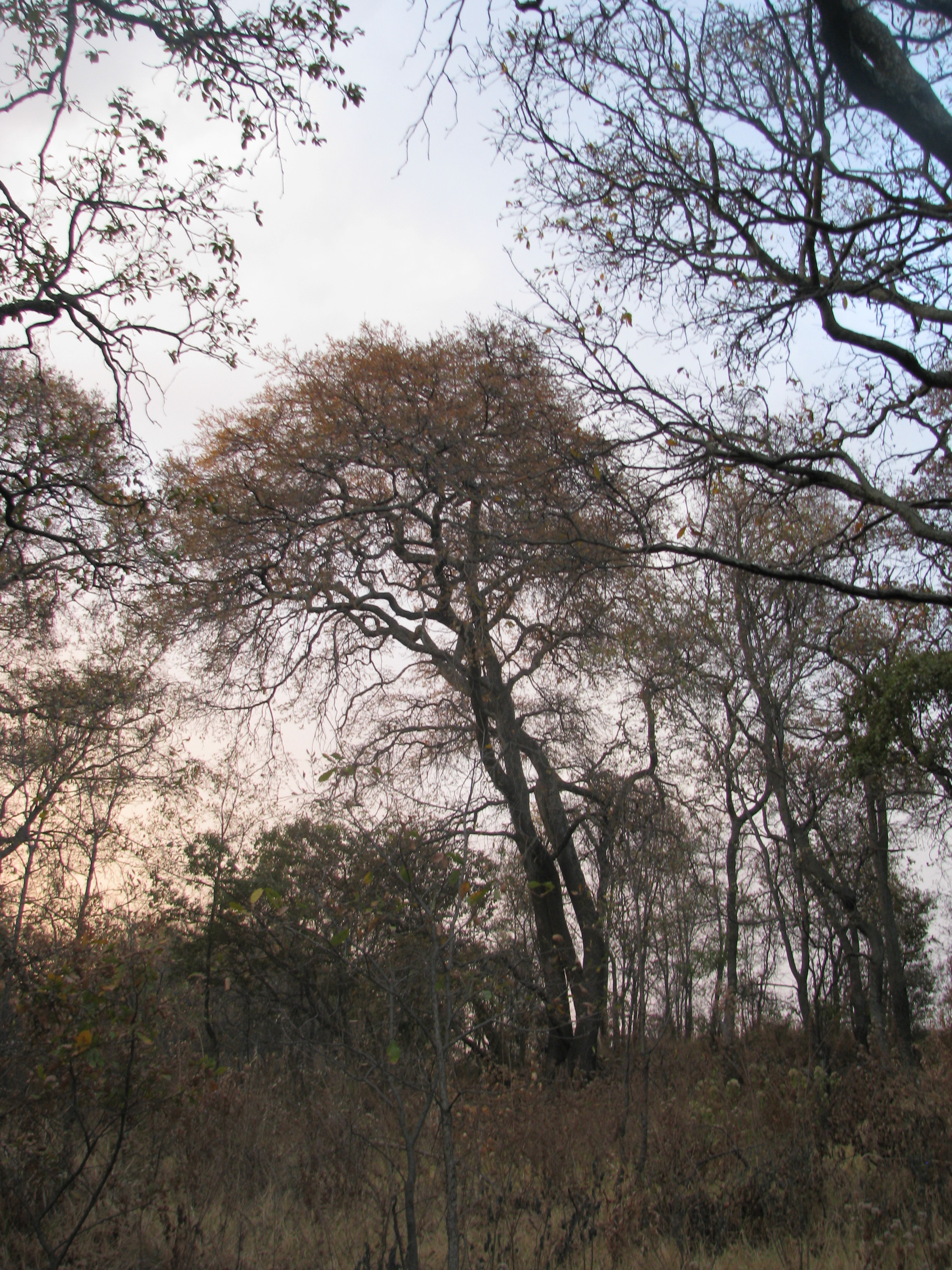
Pine-oak forest during the dry season

Nowadays, the vegetation is determined by factors such as soil, water and climate, consisting in the lower part of the municipality's territory, in trees and bushes that have been planted in some green or recreative areas that surround the urbanised areas. In the middle area, between 2,500 and 3,000 meters, exist mesophile forests that cover ravines and gullies with epiphytous vegetation such as mosses, ferns and woody creepers. In the lava rocky region there are endemic plants such as: palo loco, palo dulce, tabaquillo, tepozán and copal; species that have been preserved in the ecologic reveroir of the UNAM. The region of great vegetation density comprises the high elevations, where there are located mixed forests, with abundancy in pines and oaks. The primary tree species are oaks, limoncillo and stands of pine, that generally grow together; the more common pines are the ocotes (Pinus moctezumae) and the Mexican mountain pine (Pinus Hartwegui), this last ones resistant to the environmental conditions of the area and due to pollution are present in a low density.

Above 3,000 meters there are coniferous forests where oak and pines dominate, that can achieve heights between 5 and 12 meters. In the southern part of the municipality there are small stands of fir trees that do not reach a great development. In the region of Tizapán, San Jerónimo and El Batán there are fossils belonging to the Upper Pleistocene. On June 17, 1959, the paleontologist Manuel Maldonado Koerdell, the professor Francisco González Rul and the archeologist Arturo Romano, investigated the fossils of a horse and a mammoth "archidiskidon impera tor leidy", that lived approximately between 8 and 10 thousand years before Christ. This fossil remains, the first to be found in the whole Valley of Mexico, were located in excavations of 0.60 and 1.80 meters in the tepetate layers that are known as Tacubaya strata.

Other findings were unveiled on August 27 of the same year in the banks of the San Ángel river, in the enlargement of Las Águilas Avenue, around the town of Tlacopac.

The fauna was very varied in prehispanic times, but most of the species have become extinct. The mountain fauna was particularly rich in precious and rapacious birds.

Many of the mammals have disappeared or are in danger of extinction. In the region the while tailed deer, the lynx and the coyote were once plentiful, but the presence of man, that for many years practised hunting in the higher parts of the territory, eliminated them.

Currently, between 2,500 and 3,000 meters above sea level there remains a large fauna, but because of its nearness to the population centers it is easily accessible and thus disturbed. In the Sierra de las Cruces, a few decades ago there can still be found mammals such as the opossum, the armadillo, shrew, rabbit, tree squirrel, ardillón, land squirrel, gopher, mice, mountain mouse, pine mouse, volcano mouse, alfarero mouse and fox, even though their current populations are much diminished.

In the region there can be found the following birds: coquita, hummingbird, saltaparedes swallow, primavera, duraznero, gorrionete, amongst others. In terms of reptiles the most common are lizards, rattlesnakes, and in rocky regions, mainly snakes. In amphibians there are salamanders that inhabit the trunks of trees, frogs and ajolotes. The most distinct insects are those who inhabit the rotten trunks of pines, the bark worn. This xylophagus coleopterous and their adults live below the bark of such trees. Amongst phytophagous invertebrates there are moths of the geometrid family, whose larvae became a serious plague in the abies forest. Another butterfly that inhabited this forest, but without feeding directly from the abies, is the Synopcia eximia, whose larvae eat tepozán (Buddleia).

== Government and infrastructure ==
The Secretariat of Public Security of the Mexican federal government has its headquarters in Álvaro Obregón.

== Economy ==
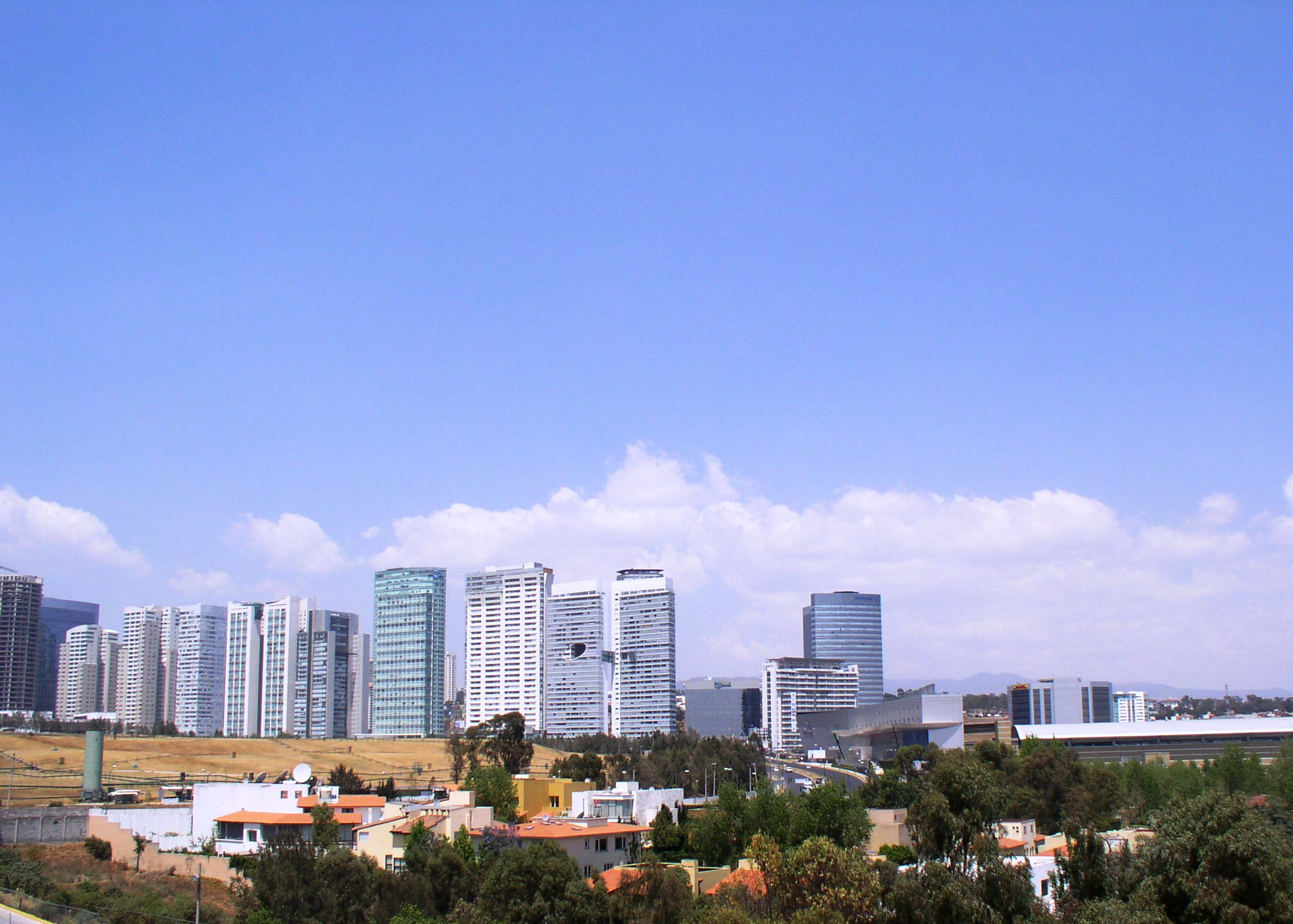
Santa Fe district.

Volaris has its headquarters in Colonia Zedec, Santa Fe, Álvaro Obregón; previously the headquarters were in Peña Blanca, Santa Fe. Grupo Bimbo has its headquarters in Santa Fe, Álvaro Obregón.

== Education ==
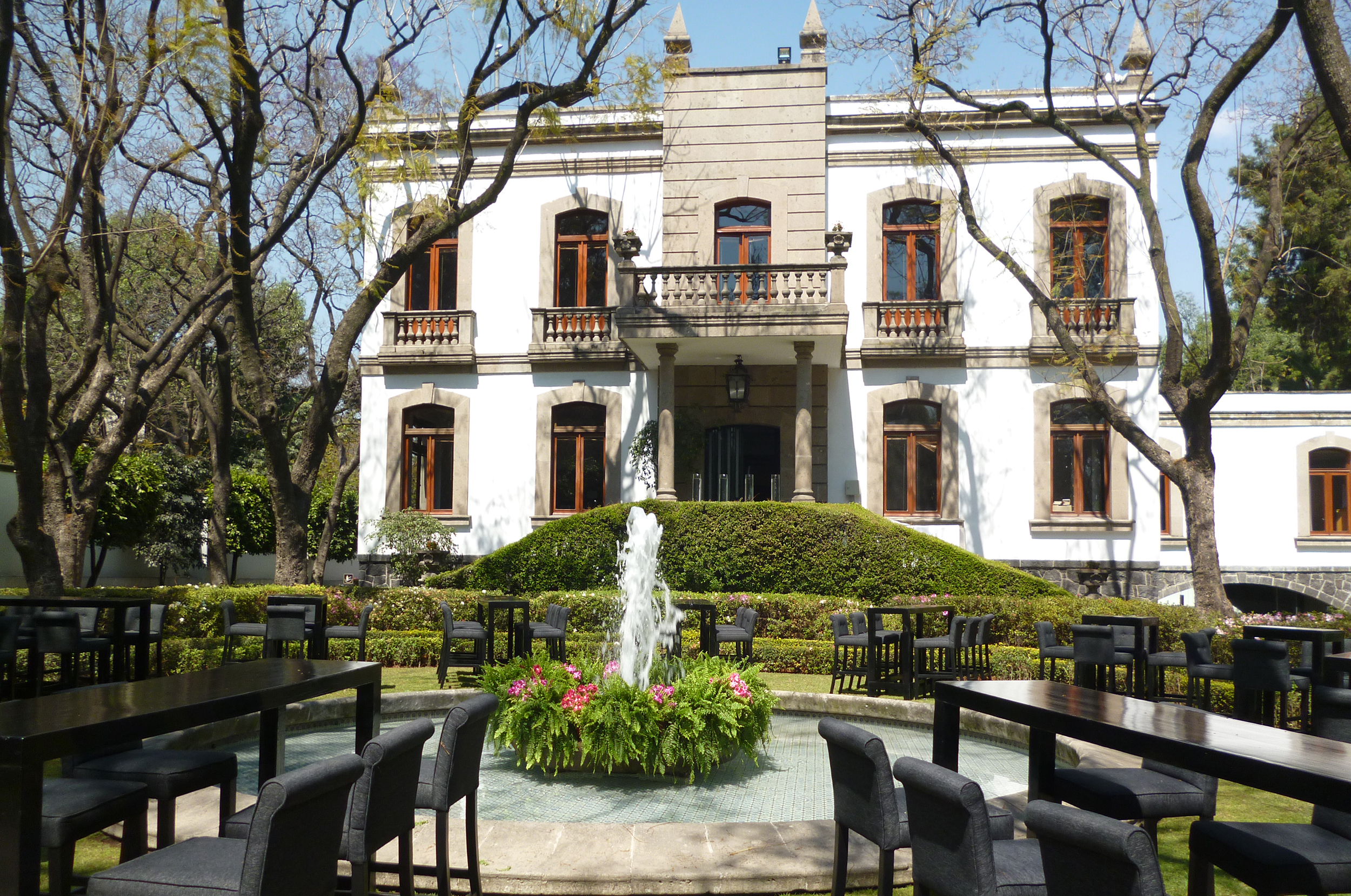
Casa de California, operated by the University of California.

National public high schools of the National Autonomous University of Mexico (UNAM) Escuela Nacional Preparatoria include:

- Escuela Nacional Preparatoria 8 "Miguel E. Schulz" (ES)

Public high schools of the Instituto de Educación Media Superior del Distrito Federal (IEMS) include:

- Escuela Preparatoria Álvaro Obregón I "Lázaro Cárdenas del Río"
- Escuela Preparatoria Álvaro Obregón II "Vasco de Quiroga"

International schools include:

- ASF Mexico, the American international school
- Edron Academy, the British educational school
- Liceo Mexicano Japonés, the Japanese educational school of Mexico City, is located in Jardines del Pedregal.
- Peterson Schools, an American international school system, has its Pedregal campus in Pedregal
- The Colegio Alemán Alexander von Humboldt operates the Plantel Pedregal, which has Kindergarten classes, as part of the Campus Sur/Campus Süd (formerly Campus Xochimilco).

Other private schools:

- Colegio Alexander Bain and Bachillerato Alexander Bain
- Colegio Olinca Altavista campus
- Colegio Princeton kindergarten and primary campuses
- Colegio Francés del Pedregal in Jardines del Pedregal
- Instituto Francisco Possenti
- Instituto Miguel Ángel
- Instituto Oxford
- Vermont School Plantel Pedregal
- Universidad Panamericana Preparatoria campus for men
- Colegio Junipero (private elementary school) (Col. Las Américas)

== Parks and recreation ==
The Asociación México Japonesa owns a cultural center, the Nichiboku Bunka Kaikan (日墨文化会館 "Mexican Japanese Cultural Center"), within the Las Águilas colonia of the Álvaro Obregón municipality.

== Notable people ==
- Jonathan Levin (born 1993), footballer
