= Jorge Camberos Garibi =

Mexican architect (1941-1996)

- Born: 18 June 1941; Guadalajara, Mexico
- Died: 17 February 1996 (aged 54); Guadalajara, Mexico
- Occupation: Architect

Jorge Camberos Garibi (18 June 1941 – 17 February 1996) was a Mexican architect.

== Biography ==
He was born in Guadalajara, on 18 June 1941. Studied at the University of Guadalajara, at the Escuela de Arquitectura (School of Architecture) founded by Ignacio Díaz Morales in 1948, where he obtained the professional license number 425303, in 1976.

He was probably the most noted urbanist in the State of Jalisco during the second half of the 20th century. Also, was a protector of the architectural patrimony.

At the time of his death, on 17 February 1996, he was the president of the College of Architects of Jalisco.

== An essay he authored ==
- La urbanización en Mesoamérica (Urbanization in Mesoamerica), Universidad de Guadalajara, Guadalajara, 1990, 45 pp.

== A book on Jorge Camberos Garibi ==
- Camberos Garibi, Jorge, por (by) Óscar Ladrón de Guevara F., Secretaría de Cultura del Gobierno del Estado de Jalisco, Guadalajara, 2008.

== See also ==
- Architecture of Mexico
