= Jardines del Bosque =

Neighborhood in the Mexican city of Guadalajara

The colonia of Jardines del Bosque is located in the western section of the city of Guadalajara, in the state of Jalisco, Mexico.

The colonia was planned by the renowned Mexican Modernist architect Luis Barragán in 1955. It was on the site of the former "Santa Edwviges" woods.

Because of the deforestation of the woods, the controversial project based on the notion of a "Garden City" was not supported by Jorge Matute, then Municipal President of Guadalajara. It was built.

The northern and original entrance of the colonia, with a primary sculpture by Mathias Goeritz, was designed in collaboration with Luis Barragán in 1957.

== See also ==
- Modernist architecture in Mexico
