= Templo Expiatorio del Santísimo Sacramento =

Church in Guadalajara, Jalisco, Mexico

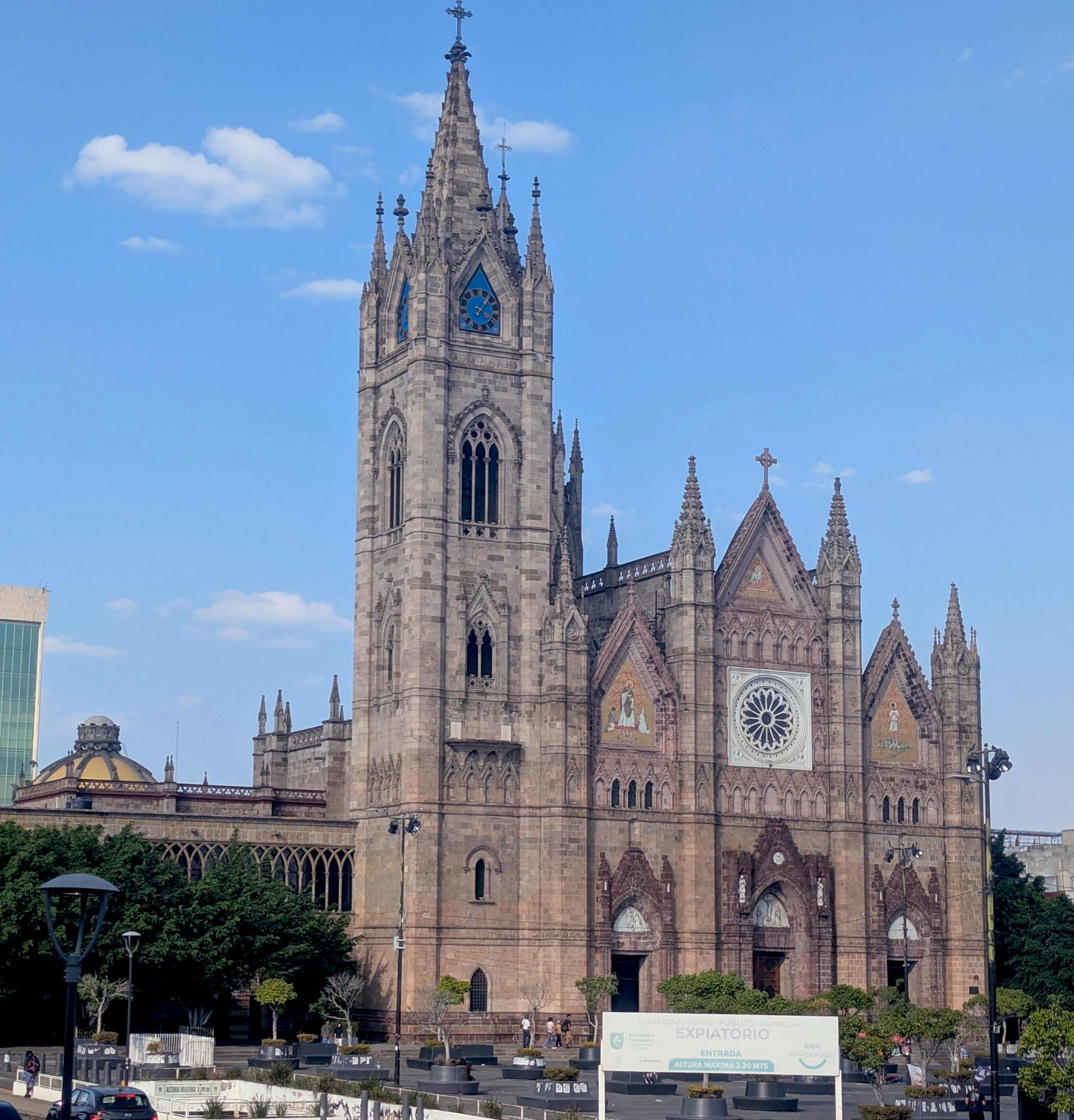

- Location within Mexico

Religion
- Affiliation: Catholic church

Location
- Location: Guadalajara, Jalisco, Mexico
- Interactive map of Templo Expiatorio del Santísimo Sacramento
- Coordinates: 20°40′25″N 103°21′32″W

The Templo Expiatorio del Santísimo Sacramento is a Catholic church dedicated to the Blessed Sacrament, located in Guadalajara, Jalisco, Mexico. It is of neo-Gothic style and one of the most representative of this style in Mexico, together with the homonymous church in León, Guanajuato, and the Sanctuary of Guadalupe in Zamora, Michoacán. Its construction began on August 15, 1897 and ended 75 years later in 1972.

== History ==
The idea of building a temple dedicated to the Blessed Sacrament in the city of Guadalajara began in the late 19th century, when a congregation of Catholics formed a committee to make this temple. So the archbishop of the city, Pedro Loza y Pardavé, together with the commission organized a competition among some architects and engineers to select the project of the temple.

The original project was designed by the engineer Salvador Collado Jasso (Arcediano Bridge), but after he died of yellow fever, the construction remained incomplete. Later, to continue the project, architect Adamo Boari was selected. Adamo Boari was a famous Italian architect brought by then-President of Mexico Porfirio Díaz, who had earlier worked in the projects of the Palacio de Bellas Artes and the Palacio de Correos de Mexico in Mexico City.

The construction began with a ceremony hosted by Archbishop Pedro Loza y Pardavé and Pedro Romero. The cornerstone was laid on August 15, 1897, and by 1911 the interior columns were already finished. The canon Pedro Moreno and foreman Feliciano Arías were in charge of the project, of whom the latter was succeeded by his son Jerónimo Arías after his death. Work on the temple was suspended during the Revolution due to religious persecution, lack of guarantees and an economic crisis that the country faced as a result of the conflict.

In February 1924, Pedro Romero died and it was assigned to the priest José Garibi Rivera the completion of the temple. He immediately asked engineer Luis Ugarte to assist him in the work. The construction boomed, and on January 6, 1927, the project was assigned to architect Ignacio Díaz Morales who oversaw the work until its completion in 1972.

== The church ==
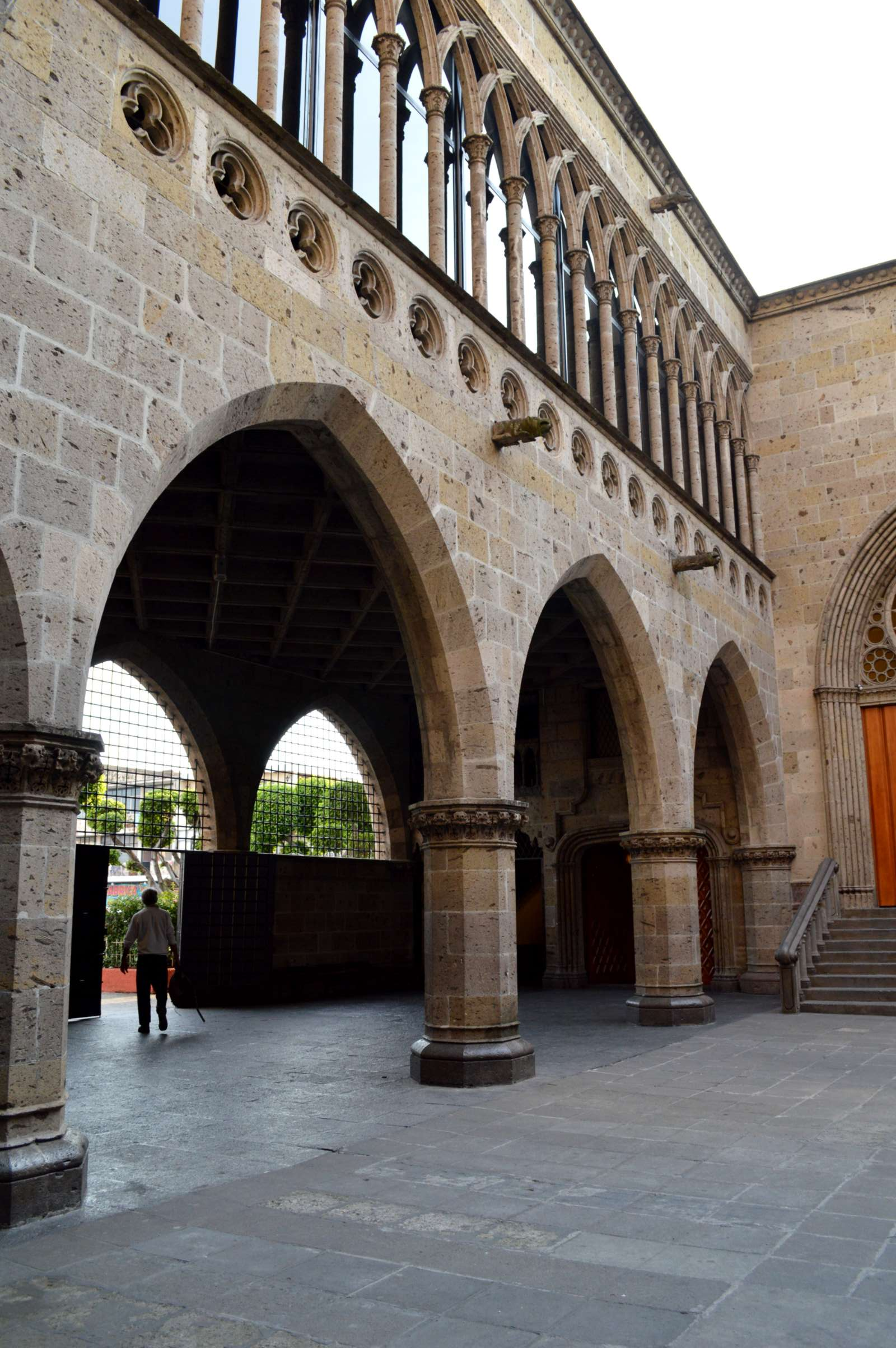
Arcade in the courtyard

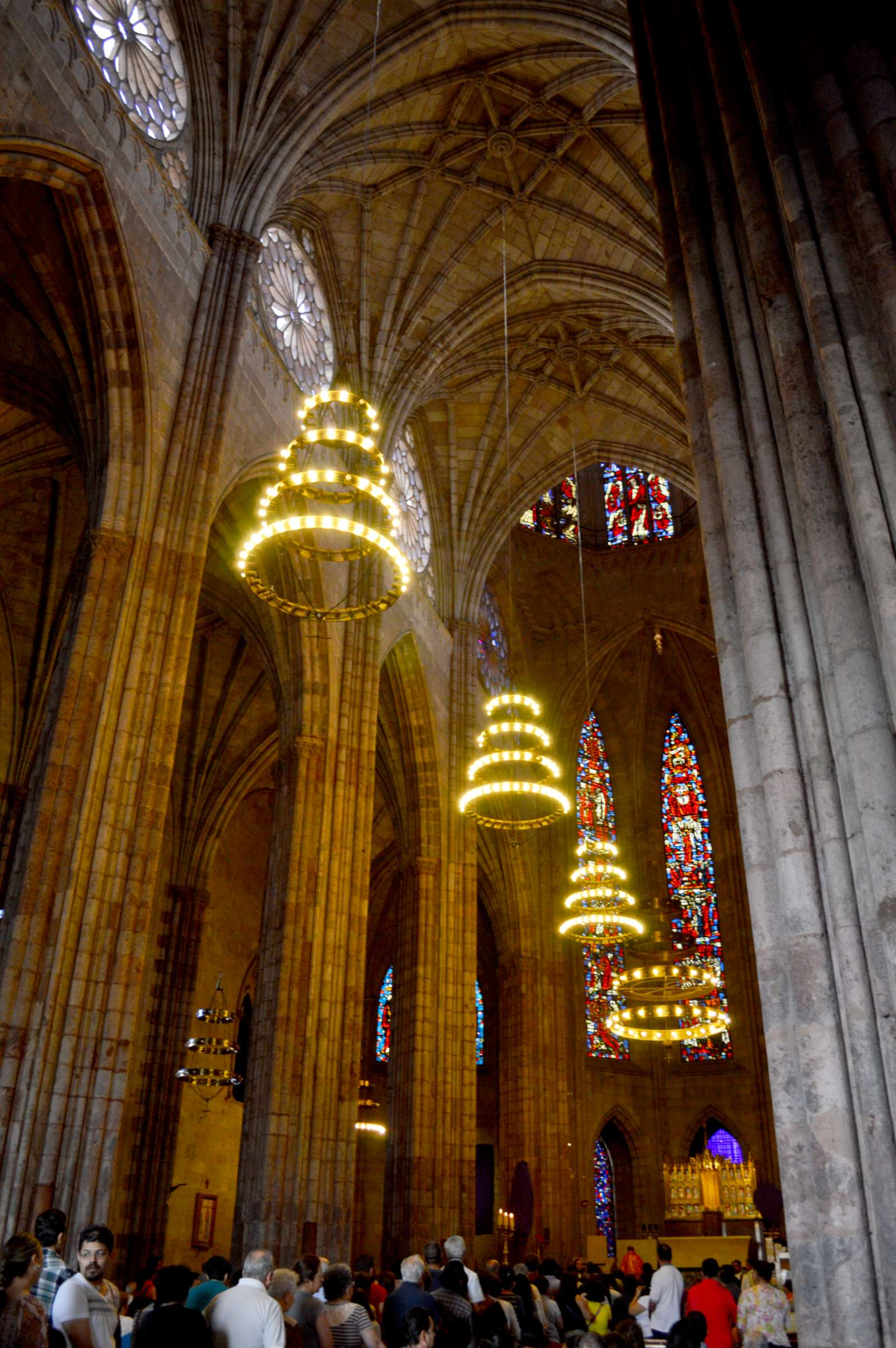
Nave interior during Mass

The temple's doors are made of granadilla wood, carved by Jesús Gómez Velazco, and they are incrusted with bronze high reliefs made by master Benito Castañeda. The three tympana on the church's facade (which is a copy of the facade of Cathedral of Orvieto) are embellished with Italian mosaics created in the Vatican's Mosaic Factory. The central one represents the Paschal Lamb; the east, Saint Tarcisius; and the west, St. Pius X. They were designed by painter and expert on the Vatican Museums, Francisco Bencivenga, who also oversaw the placement of them.

The church clock, imported from Germany has four lighted dials, and was brought along with a carillon of 25 bells playing 25 pieces both religious and popular music, such as: Ave María, the Mexican National Anthem, Las Mañanitas, Guadalajara, Adiós Mariquita Linda, Las Golondrinas, México Lindo y Querido, and the March of Zacatecas. This chime can also be played from a keyboard in the choir. The cost of the clock was about 450 million pesos from 1972, (worth MXN$450,000 today), and was installed by German technicians. There is an interesting detail on the campanile which consists of miniature statues of the 12 apostles which rotate in and out of the tower whenever a musical piece is played.

The church is made mostly of stone, carved as it was done in the Middle Ages. The huge, stained glass windows, including the rosette on the façade, were executed by Jacques and Gérard Degusseau of Orléans in France, according to cartons of the artist Maurice Rocher of Paris.
