= Mathias Goeritz =

German-Mexican artist (1915–1990)

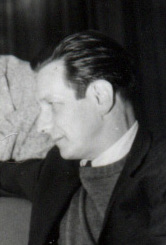
- Born: 4 April 1915; Danzig
- Died: 4 August 1990 (aged 75); Mexico City, Mexico
- Education: Humboldt University of Berlin
- Known for: Visual arts
- Notable work: Torres de la Ciudad Satélite; Ruta de la Amistad
- Spouse: Marianne Gast

Werner Mathias Goeritz Brunner (4 April 1915, Danzig, German Empire – 4 August 1990, Mexico City) was a German and Mexican painter and sculptor. After spending much of the 1940s in North Africa and Spain, he and his wife, photographer Marianne Gast, immigrated to Mexico in 1949.

== Early life and education ==
Mathias Goeritz was born in Danzig, German Empire (now Gdańsk, Poland) on 4 April 1915 and spent his childhood in Berlin. The Jüdische Allgemeine calls him "a Mexican Jew", the son of Jewish lawyer Ernst Goeritz; his biographer Lily Kassner describes the family as Protestant.

He began studying philosophy and the history of art at Berlin's Friedrich-Wilhelm-Universität, now known as the Humboldt University of Berlin, in 1934. He received a doctorate in art history from this institution in 1940. His doctoral dissertation on the nineteenth-century German painter Ferdinand von Rayski was published as Ferdinand Von Rayski und die Kunst des Neunzehnten Jahrhunderts. During the course of his studies, Goeritz also trained as an artist at the Kunstgewerbe- und Handwerkerschule in Berlin-Charlottenburg (Applied arts and tradesmen's school), where he studied drawing with German artists Max Kaus and Hans Orlowski.

== Career ==
Upon completion of his doctorate, Goeritz worked at Berlin's Nationalgalerie (National Gallery), now the Alte Nationalgalerie, under the supervision of nineteenth-century art specialist Paul Ortwin Rave.

In early 1941, in the midst of the Second World War, Goeritz left Germany, settling first in Tetuan, Morocco. In 1942 he married photographer Marianne Gast, and the couple settled in Granada, Spain, just after the war ended in 1945.

In June 1946, he had his first solo exhibition at the Librería-Galería Clan in Madrid under the pseudonym "Ma-Gó". in 1947 the Goeritzs relocated to Madrid. There, Goeritz developed a close friendship with Spanish sculptor Ángel Ferrant.

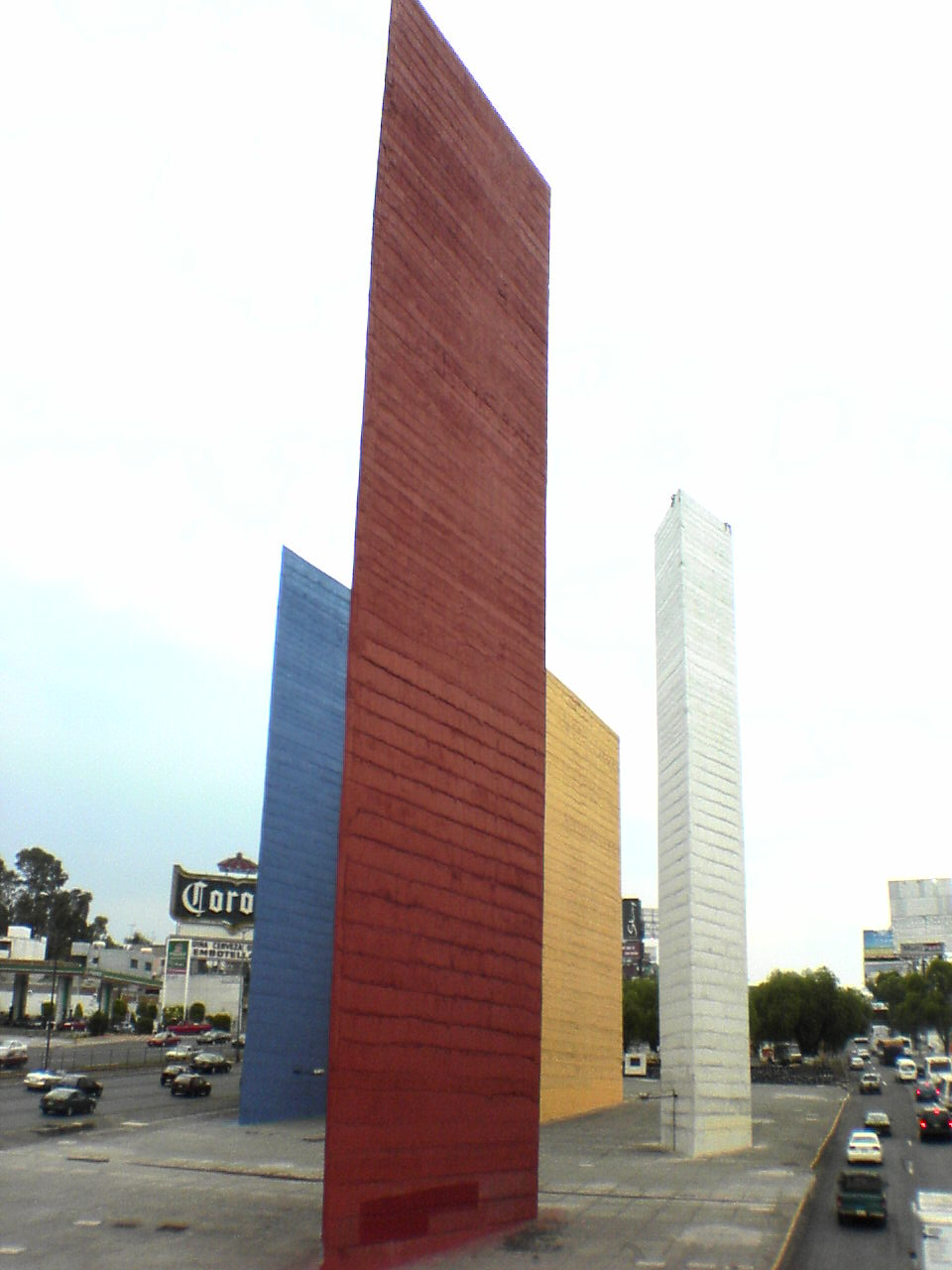
Torres de Satélite, Ciudad Satelite, México, by Luis Barragán and Mathias Goeritz

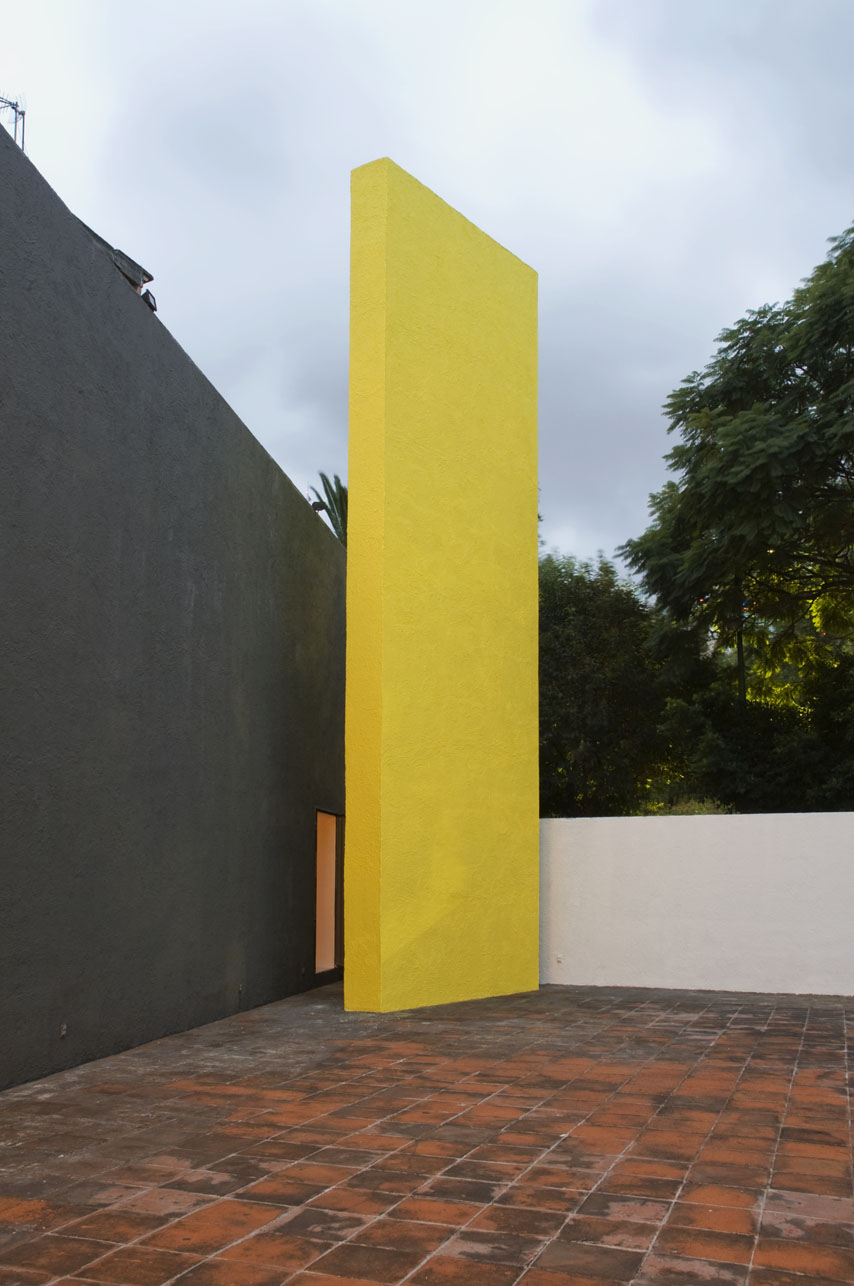
Yellow wall at El Eco's patio

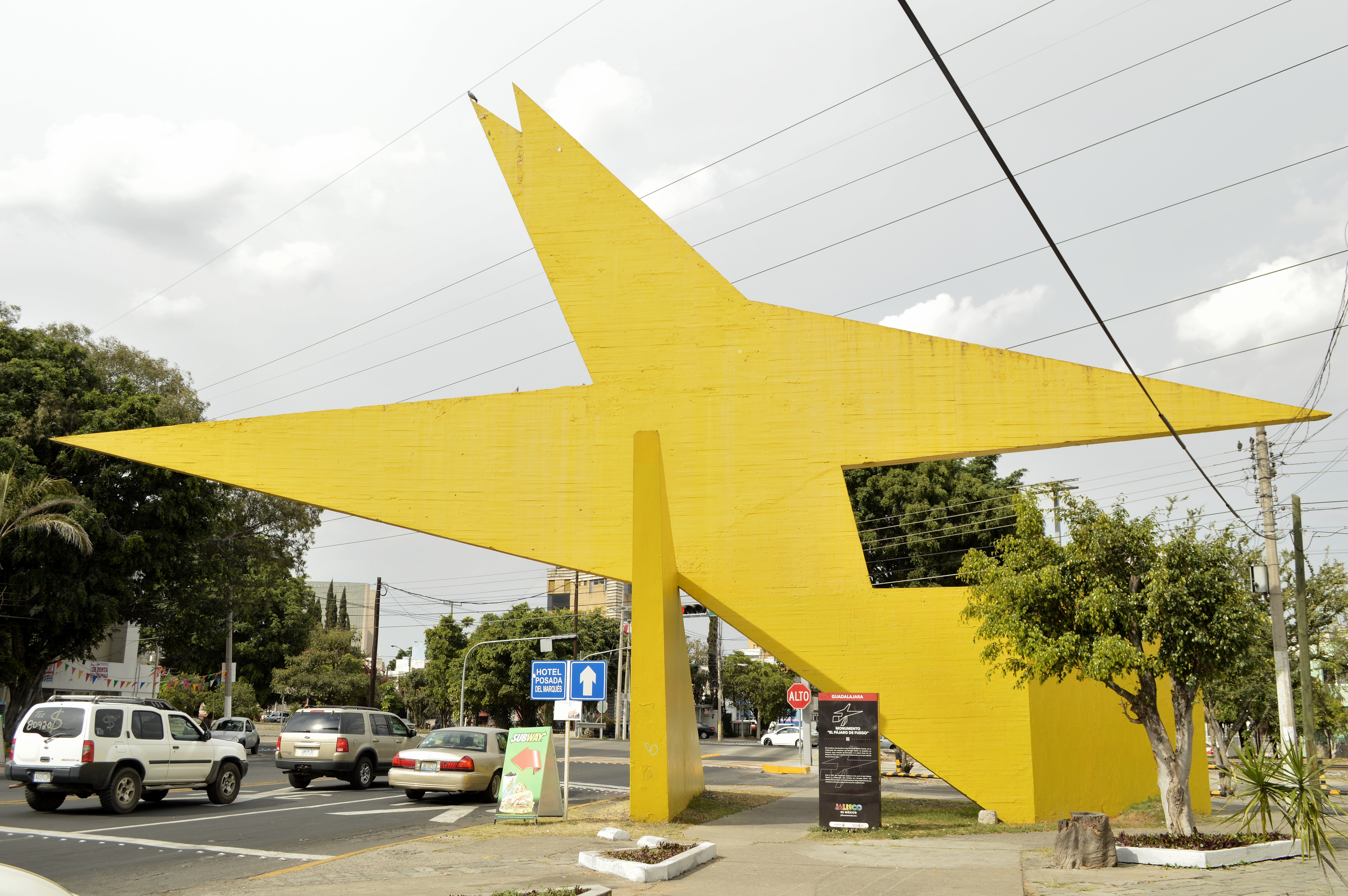
El pájaro de fuego (The fire bird) by Goeritz. In Guadalajara, Jalisco, Mexico. View from south.

In the summer of 1948, Goeritz and Ferrant traveled to visit the prehistoric paintings of the Cave of Altamira in the north of Spain, along with writer Ricardo Gullón and others. At that time Goeritz proposed the founding of an Escuela de Altamira (Altamira School), an association of artists and writers who would meet annually near the Cave, in 1948. The Escuela de Altamira would ultimately hold two meetings, in 1949 and 1950.

In 1949, through the intervention of Mexican architect Ignacio Díaz Morales, Goeritz was offered a job teaching art history to the students of the newly founded the school of architecture (now part of CUAAD, University of Guadalajara) in Guadalajara, Mexico. In 1953, he first presented his "Manifiesto de la Arquitectura Emocional" (Emotional Architecture Manifesto) at the pre-inauguration of the Museo Experimental El Eco in Mexico City, which he designed in 1952–53. During the 1950s, Goeritz also collaborated with Luis Barragán to make monumental abstract sculptures in reinforced concrete, including El animal del Pedregal (The Animal of the Pedregal, 1951) and the Torres de la Ciudad Satélite (Towers of Satellite City, 1957).

In 1989,Goeritz became an honorary member of the Mexican Academia de Artes.

== Personal life and death ==
In 1942, he married photographer Marianne Gast.

Mathias Goeritz died on August 4, 1990, in Mexico City at the age of 75.

== Works and legacy ==
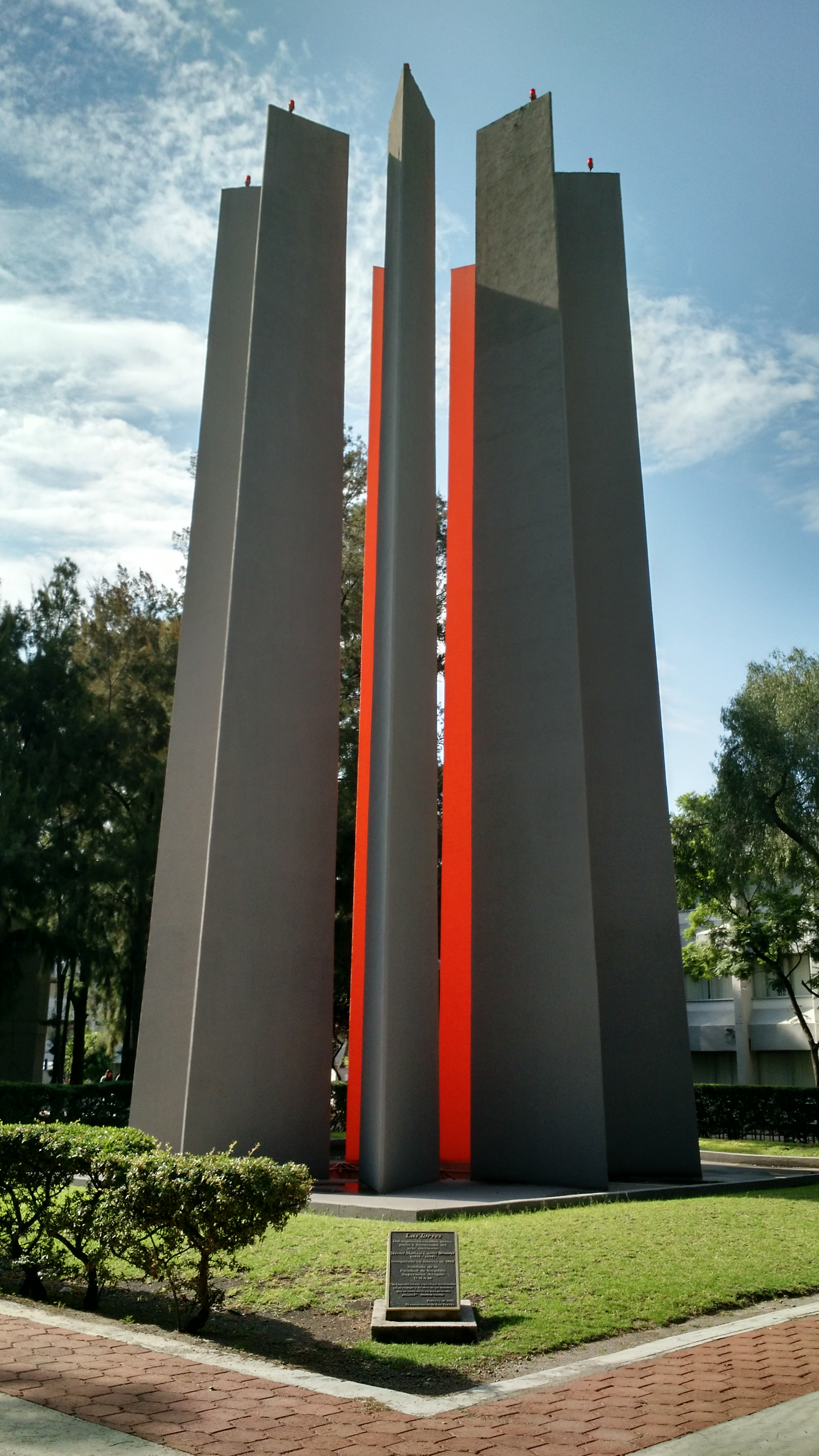
Las Torres, the main emblem of the School of High Studies (FES) Aragón of the National Autonomous University of Mexico

Goeritz exhibited widely in Mexico and beyond throughout his life, and had a significant influence on younger Mexican artists such as Helen Escobedo and Pedro Friedeberg.

- El animal del Pedregal (The Animal of Pedregal, 1951), sculpture in reinforced concrete, Jardines de Pedregal de San Ángel, Mexico City.
- Los amantes (The Lovers), sculpture at the Hotel Presidente, Acapulco.
- El bailarín (The Dancer).
- La mano divina (The Divine Hand) and La mano codiciosa (The Covetous Hand), reliefs in the Iglesia de San Lorenzo, Mexico City.
- El Eco Museo Experimental ("El Eco" Experimental Museum, 1953), Mexico City.
- El Pájaro Amarillo (The Yellow Bird, 1957) Colonia Jardines del Bosque, Guadalajara.
- Torres de la Ciudad Satélite (Towers of Satellite City, 1957) with Luis Barragán.
- Stained Glass windows for the cathedrals of Mexico City and Cuernavaca, the churches of Santiago Tlatelolco and Azcapotzalco, and the Maguén-David synagogue, Mexico City.
- Coordination of the sculptures of the Ruta de la Amistad (Route of Friendship), a major project of the Cultural Program of the 1968 Mexico City Olympics.
- Osa Mayor (Ursa Major, 1968), Palacio de los Deportes, Mexico City.
- Torres de Automex (Automex Towers, 1963–64), Carretera de Toluca.
- Pirámide de Mixcoac (Mixcoac Pyramid, 1971), Mexico City.
- Murals for the Arco Tower in Los Angeles, California, United States, 1970.
- Corona de Bambi and Espacio Escultórico (Sculpture Space, 1979), Ciudad Universitaria, UNAM, Mexico City.
- Laberinto de Jerusalén (Jerusalem Labyrinth), 1978-1980.
- Massive bronze entry door for the John Lautner-designed residence "Marbrisa", Acapulco, 1973

== See also ==
- List of people from Danzig
