= Jesús Reyes Ferreira =

Mexican artist (1880–1977)

Jesús Reyes Ferreira (1880-1977), born José de Jesús Benjamín Buenaventura de los Reyes y Ferreira and also known as Chucho Reyes, was a self-taught artist and antiques/art collector and vendor. Reyes Ferreira began painting on crêpe paper, a delicate material not meant to last, as a way of decorating paper meant to wrap sales from his antiques/art store. The decorated paper became popular enough to be sold on its own. Although he began this activity in Guadalajara, he did not produce the bulk of his work until after he moved to Mexico City when he was 58 years old. Here he continued collecting and selling objects such as colonial art and Mexican handcrafts and folk art, being one of the early exponents for the appreciation of these objects. He also spent several hours a day painting. His work was first exhibited in 1950 with his first individual exhibition in 1967 at the Palacio de Bellas Artes after a half century of painting. As a self-taught painter, his works are relatively simple and often are dismissed as folk painting but they were and his aesthetics were praised by famous artists and architects at the time.

== Life ==
Reyes Ferreira was born on October 17, 1880, in Guadalajara to Buenaventura Reyes y Zavala and Felipa Ferreira Flores. His childhood home was on Morelos Street in Guadalajara, a typical house for the area, with a central courtyard, rooms connected by halls lined with railings and flowerpots. Today the structure is the Museo de los Títeres or Marionette Museum. His family was cultured and his father was eccentric and very strict. He was initially homeschooled by his father, but completed primary school at the Liceo de Varones, where he took art classes.

After primary school he worked at a number of jobs. While working at a chocolate factory, he noticed the interesting patterns that the grease made on the wrapping paper. He had his first contact with art in 1894, becoming an apprentice at the Loreto y Ancira lithography and print shop. He then worked an art supply store called Casa Pellandina in Guadalajara. He started as general help but then moved onto creating displays and decorating the store’s windows. From there he began to become known for the decoration of event spaces such as rental halls and churches for events such as weddings and baptisms for wealthy families. Interested in handcrafts and folk art, he frequently visited the El Rincon del Diablo fireworks workshop to watch them paint the Judas figures and fireworks frames. He also worked in silver shops learning how to cast the metal. He designed a number of pieces, some of which remain in the family.

He met Amelia Rivas while working at the art store. He began to court her but she died shortly thereafter of tuberculosis .

His father died in 1911, leaving him the house and a collection of art, handcrafts and antiques, prompting interest in these areas. The house became something a haven for artists and other bohemian types as he used part of it to sell antiques and art. Another section became something of a museum. He became well known not only to Guadalajara artists but also a number of artists from Mexico City. Reyes was considered eccentric. When Reyes Ferreira bought a book, he always bought two copies, one to cut up to create a new design and the other to keep intact. He began drawing and painting on the crepe paper used to wrap purchases from his store, these drawings became popular and soon clients were buying the paper for its own sake.

In 1938, he was denounced for unusual “sexual preferences.” He was arrested along with a number of youths from upper society. He was beaten by police and forced to wear a sign saying that he was a corrupter of youth. The incident forced Reyes Ferreira to sell his childhood home and move to Mexico City.

He was helped in his move by artist friends from the capital including André Breton and Frida Kahlo . He moved into an old colonial house on Milan Street in Colonia Juárez, where he lived with his two sisters, Antonia and Maria. He decorated it unusually, with lighted cubes, various colors and niches for religious objects. The courtyard was used as a studio for painting and he continued to sell antiques and art. He also continued to have his house open to writers, intellectuals and artists such as Carlos Pellicer, Salvador Novo, Juan Soriano, Raúl Anguiano, Jorge Enciso, Diego Rivera as well as architects such as Luis Barragán and Matias Goeritz .

When he was 87 years old he traveled for the first time outside Mexico, heading to Paris, Rome, Madrid. A year later he went to the Middle East. He also visited New York.

He died on August 6, 1977, at the age 96 in Mexico City.

== Career ==
Reyes Ferreira is principally known for being a painter and a collector/vender of antiques and art.

Despite his early interest in art, he had no intention of becoming an artist. As an antiques vender in Guadalajara, he began painting the crepe paper used for wrapping sales just as a way to decorate it. Sales of his paintings began when customers came to the store to buy the painted paper. Despite the sales of the paper in Guadalajara, he produced 85% of his artwork after he moved to Mexico City when he was 58 years old. He spent several hours a day painting on crepe paper and cardboard in courtyard of his house.

His work was exhibited in New York in 1942, London in 1945 and at the Galería Arquitac en Guadalajara. In 1961 he participated in the Exposición de los Hartos, an international art event at the Galería Antonio Souza. However, he did not have his first individual exhibition until 1967, at the Palacio de Bellas Artes after a half century of painting. This was followed by exhibitions at the Casa de la Cultura Jalisciense in 1968, the Galería Pecanins in Barcelona in 1972, the Ex-convento del Carmen in Guadalajara in 1973 and his last exhibition at the Galería Pecanins of Mexico City in 1975. Before his death, there was a retrospective of his work at the ExConvento del Carmen in Guadalajara. His work achieved popularity in the United States, South America and Europe as well as Mexico. His works have since been displayed at the Foggs Museum in Boston and the Haymarket Gallery in London.

He was a collector and seller of antiques and art, especially colonial art and Mexican handcrafts and folk art. He was one of the pioneers of the movement to appreciate these forms in the 20th century. He was an important promoter of folk and colonial art in Mexico, stating that it was important to understanding the fine arts of the 20th century in Mexico. In both his homes in Guadalajara and Mexico City he sold art and antiques, as well as added to his own collection. He had a good eye for art and antiques, winning the admiration of other collectors such as Franz Mayer. By the time he died, the collection included thousands of objects including 180 paintings, sculptures and other arts from the 17th to 19th centuries which were exhibited in a show called La Mirada Estetica de Jesus Reyes Ferreira at the Museo de Arte Moderno in 2002.

He also worked with architects as an advisor on color schemes and decoration. He worked with Luis Barragán in San Ángel in the 1950s.

His first recognition as an artist was in 1962 from the Palacio de Bellas Artes. In 1972 a gallery in San Angel was named after him, holding an exhibition of his work. In 1977 he was honored at the Universidad de Guadalajara along with Raúl Anguiano, Carlos Orozco Romero and Pedro Medina “El Charro” receiving the José Clemente Orozco medal. His biography by Lily Kassner was published by Editorial RM in 2000.

== Artistry ==
One unique aspect to Reyes Ferreira’s work is that it was painted mostly on fragile crepe paper and sometimes cardboards, materials not made to last. He generally painted early in the morning for the light and never used an easel. He laid the crepe paper out over a silk base flat on a table in order to withstand the painting process. A scientific analysis shows that he mixed oils, plant based paints and gouaches. The works are fragile and degrade with time, making documentation the only way to preserve them.

His works have simple lines with a naïve quality, but also with bold colors. It shows influence from Mexican folk art, colonial art and pre Hispanic art as well as popular architecture. The images he painted include roosters, circus acts, angels, skeletons, horses and flowers. There is influence from traditional handcrafts in the depictions of toys. His depictions were not always traditional and included dolls dressed as prostitutes. He was religious which led him to paint images of Christ and the Virgin Mary as well as monks, saints, Adam and Eve, cherubs, angels and devils. He also painted images of dead girls with a sense of Christian piety depicting them as angels.

His work has been described as Surrealist, and his use of reduced forms described as Expressionist. His images use bold colors which stray from their forms.

He was self-taught, never accepting the title of “painter.” He claimed that he did not paint but rather “cover in mud” or “smear colors.” However, his work impressed others. Reyes Ferreira met Marc Chagall when the latter came to Mexico for a performance of the Aleko Ballet. Reyes Ferreira went to the Palacio de Bellas Artes to give some of his paintings to the Russian, which he humbly called “papers.” Chagall was impressed with the work, calling Reyes Ferreiro the “Mexican Chagall.” On one occasion Picasso remarked about his work that it was fresh and it must be from a young artist, when Reyes Ferreira was 70. Carlos Monsiváis called his work “a song of happiness.”

Reyes Ferreira’s two main influences were José Clemente Orozco, also from Guadalajara and José Guadalupe Posada, as can be seen with images of skulls with flowers. Unlike these two, his work was not social criticism. His images are based on popular and folk art but without obvious effort to promote Mexican identity such as was the case with Mexican muralism even though Reyes Ferreira admired Orozco. He influenced a number of architects in color schemes such as Luis Barragan, Mathias Goeritz, Max Cetto, Juan Sordo Madaleno and Ricardo Legorreta . He was admired by many architects and others for his sense of aesthetics although his wilder ideas were not or could not be executed.

There has been no systematic or in-depth study of his work. One reason for this is that for many years, art critics dismissed his art as folk painting, with his activities as a collector and antiques dealer considered more important. Although part of a number of museum collections, they are generally not on display or in museum catalogs of the most important Mexican museums such as MUNAL or the Museo de Arte Moderno. The Fundación Luis Barragán holds 194 of his works which were either sold or given to the architect. Despite the lack of museum attention, the works have been frequently forged.

== See also ==
- Torres de Satélite
