= Ciudad Satélite =

- Neighborhood (Fraccionamiento)
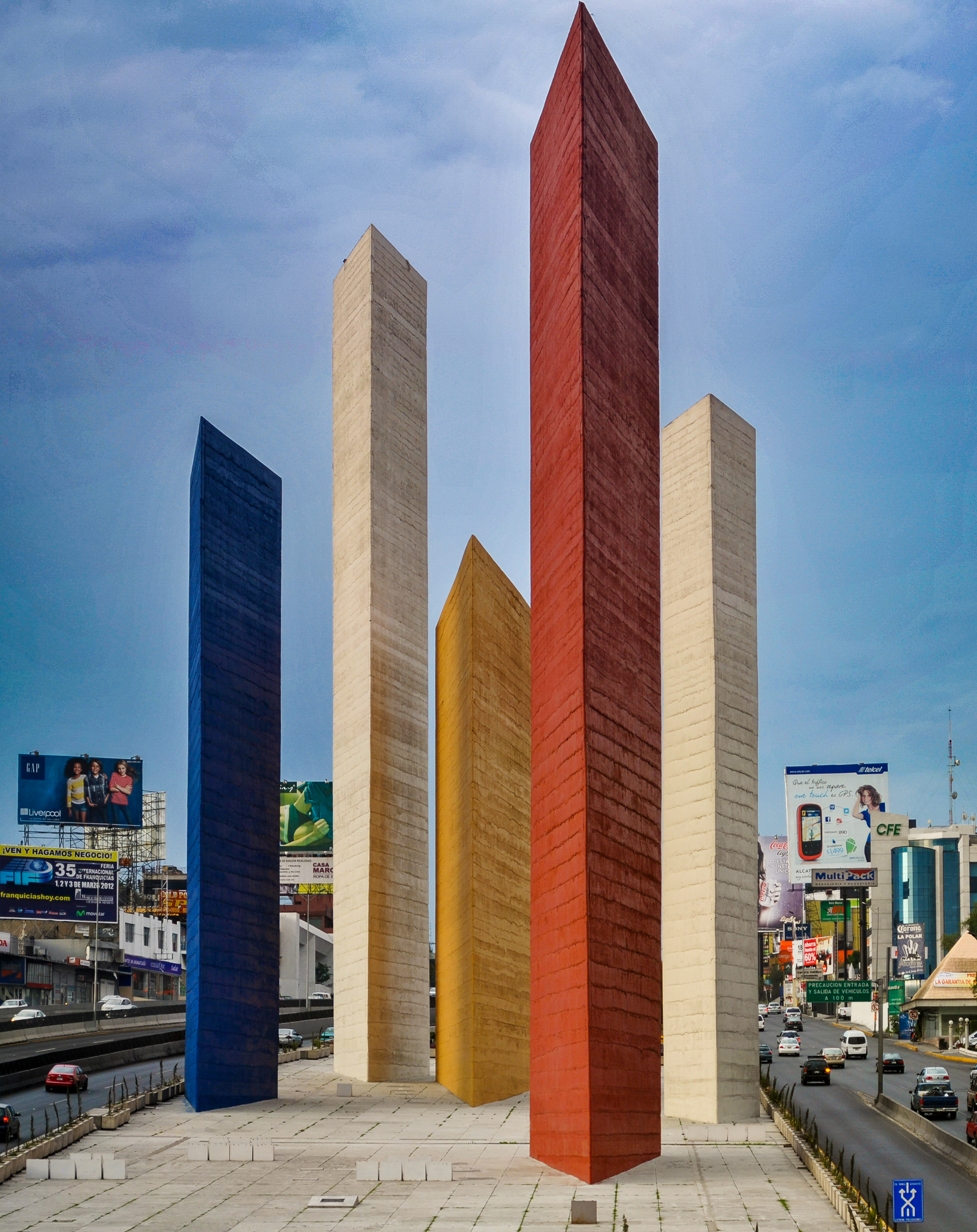
- Torres de Satélite landmark
- Nickname: Satélite
- Location within Mexico Location within State of Mexico Location within North America Location within Earth
- Coordinates: 19.5166646°N 99.249999°W
- Country: Mexico
- State: State of Mexico
- Municipality: Naucalpan de Juárez
- Established: 1957

Government
  - Body: Asociación de Colonos de Ciudad Satélite

Area
  - Neighborhood (Fraccionamiento): 36,003 ha (88,970 acres)
  - Water: 0 km^{2} (0 sq mi) 0%
  - Rural: 0 km^{2} (0 sq mi)

Population
  - Neighborhood (Fraccionamiento): 10,600
  - Density: 29.4/km^{2} (76.3/sq mi)
- Demonym: Sateluco
- Time zone: UTC-6
- Postal code: 53100
- Area code: 55
- Website: www.ciudadsatelite.tv

Ciudad Satélite (lit. transl. Satellite City), commonly known as Satélite, is a middle-, upper-middle and upper-class area in Naucalpan, in the western part of Greater Mexico City, located some 14 km northwest of the Historic Mexico City Center. Officially, the name corresponds exclusively to the homonym neighbourhood, Ciudad Satélite, founded circa 1957. With time, the surrounding areas (including middle- and upper-middle-class neighbourhoods like Lomas Verdes, Echegaray, Paseos del Bosque or San Mateo), alongside adjacent municipalities Atizapán de Zaragoza and Tlalnepantla de Baz, have collectively been grouped as "Satélite", due to their relevance and influence, both economically and socially. It has been modelled on urban areas in United States and England.

Initially conceived as a "city outside the city", as an early response to the increasing population of Mexico City's upper-classes, Satélite has been one of Mexico's most prominent architectural ventures during the 20th century. Designed and built by Mexican architects Mario Pani and José Luis Cuevas Pietrasanta, under the aegis of then-president Miguel Alemán Valdés (1946–1952) and his family ranch, Los Pirules (which was purchased from the Centurión-Fuentes family on the hacienda Los Chabacanos), it quickly became popular among wealthy locals who wanted to acquire property outside the city proper.

== Definition ==
Satélite was originally conceived as a satellite city, a commuter-bedroom community that developers hoped to maintain as a greenbelt between it and Mexico City itself; however, rapid development (and subsequent real estate market increases) made this untenable.

Still, popular culture, market segmentation, availability of services, and comings-and-goings of people in the area have helped to define Satélite as a major cultural center. Ciudad Satélite became the core of a new suburban phenomenon that eventually included not only single-family dwellings but also apartment buildings, condominiums, and retail spaces. In a vast departure from the original plans, some manufacturing also developed. Over time, the progress of real estate development has expanded on the original meaning of the Satélite community in the minds of Mexico City residents.

The project was approved by the then president Miguel Alemán Valdés in 1948. The city remained uninhabited until 1952 when people started to move in because of the attractive prices. Public services, such as the phone lines, were not finished yet in all circuits, and people initially had to use public phones. By the 1970s, the Ciudad Satélite population had greatly increased.

Due to rapid growth, more neighborhoods were developed and are now considered part of the area of Satélite. These neighborhoods are Las Américas neighbourhood, next to Naucalpan City Hall, Vista del Valle (after the famous Norwegian poet), Paseos del Bosque, Pedregal de Echegaray, and El Mirador. Some consider the neighbourhoods of San Mateo, La Florida, and the Echegaray borough to be part of the south zone of Satélite. The central-western zone consists of Ciudad Satélite, the core neighbourhood, Lomas Verdes, Boulevares, Naucalli Park, and La Concordia. The northern zone consists of the Fuentes de Satélite, Santa Cruz del Monte, Bellavista, and Calacoaya neighbourhoods.

== History ==
Limited pre-Hispanic facts are known about the area. At one point, the Tlatilco culture lived in the area formed between the Totolinga, Los Cuartos, and Hondo rivers. Later, during the colonial period, the Shrine of Our Lady of Los Remedios was built when a Spanish officer found the religious figure under a maguey plant. It is said that the small virgin had been brought by Gonzalo Rodríguez de Villafuerte. The shrine, which divides the Satélite area from the popular zones of Naucalpan municipality, was built in the sixteenth century, and in the architectural compound are the well-known caracoles ("snail") towers of the Los Remedios Aqueduct.

Ciudad Satélite, the core neighborhood, started as a new urban concept in the mid-1950s, as the rapid growth of Mexico City and the rise of a new, energetic middle-class ushered-in the development of entirely new districts. The grounds of the northwestern suburbs of the city (near the old highway to Querétaro) originally belonged to aforementioned President Alemán Valdés, who had maintained some property and built a mansion in Doctors' Circuit. Architect Mario Pani created most of the urban side of the design.

Ciudad Satélite lacks traffic lights due to its street layout with "circuitos", or wide, oval circuits that, connecting with other main roads, allow drivers to see oncoming cars. Each Ciudad Satélite circuit bears the name of an influential Mexican, such as in the Centro Comercial (The Mall) and Centro Cívico (Civic Center), including many famous individuals from the world of architecture, the arts, diplomacy, economics, education, engineering, entertainment, geography, health care, law, military, religion, science, and social justice.

The urban design and the original pricing of the land were deliberately intended for segmenting the new city into three areas, notably, a middle-class, upper-middle-class and upper-class. Novelists and economists were the circuits with the highest land prices, hence the most spectacular manors were built there.

Many of Ciudad Satélite's houses were built in a functionalist style, lacking decorative elements in their façades. This style also is evident in Ciudad Satélite's cathedral, the San Felipe de Jesús Sanctuary. This grand, spectacular church features many functionalist elements, as well as paintings. Other styles present in the neighborhood are colonial, modernist (vintage Mexican architecture), and Spanish or Californian colonial style.

Further neighborhoods were then developed, and the urban extension of Satélite area has been growing ever since. Contemporary issues in Satélite include heavy traffic congestion (this is a commuter zone, with many people driving to Mexico City at all hours), the decrepit state of many roads, new concerns of car robberies, violations of environmental regulations, saturation and oversupply of real estate due to new developments, and unauthorised commerce in residential-designed zones.

== Sights ==
Much of the old history of the area is seen in the Our Lady of Los Remedios Shrine and its aqueduct.

The Torres de Satélite (Satellite Towers) landmark stands in the middle of Periferico, Mexico City's main freeway. Designed by Mathias Goeritz and Luis Barragán and inspired by the painter Jesus Reyes Ferreyra's ideas, it is a significant piece of modern sculpture and architecture. As ownership of the site where they were built is unclear, they were not maintained by any government and fell into disrepair. In the late 1990s, they were repainted in their original colors, which had been chosen by Barragán.

Naucalli Park is a large extension of eucalyptus forest devoted to the recreation of locals and other inhabitants of nearby areas. It used to be an ejido (communal agricultural grounds) called Ejido de Oro. An expropriation decree converted it into a park which has a jogging circuit, many playground spots, monumental fountains, a convention center, an Aaora (forum for art exhibits), a culture house, the branch of a well-known Mexico City restaurant, an archery training ground, a big forum for classical music concerts (the State of Mexico Symphonic Orchestra used to play here on Sundays) and an amusement park with animatronic dinosaurs.

Plaza Satélite, built in the late sixties by the studio of architect Juan Sordo Madaleno, is one of the biggest malls in Mexico City. It has undergone two full renewals and features big department stores, music stores, restaurants, boutiques, services, and a big cinema complex.

Luis Barragán's landscape sculptures can be seen in Arboledas neighbourhood. However, some are in a decrepit state.

== Education, culture and sports ==
Satélite has some private schools as well as a couple of public junior high schools. School competition is officially low but is a big issue of pride for many "satelucos". The area houses the UNAM Faculty of Superior Studies at Acatlán and a Universidad del Valle de Mexico (UVM) university campus.

Some of Mexico's Olympic medallists have lived or currently live here, including Carlos Mercenario, Soraya Jiménez, Dolores Knoll, and Fernando Platas. In the lower zone of Boulevares, almost next to Acatlán Town, are the fields of the zone representative teams, such as the Buccaneers (Bucaneros), the Cowboys (Vaqueros), the Black Dogs (Perros Negros), and the Redskins (Pieles Rojas). There is also a local soccer football league, Liga de Fútbol Satélite.

Cultural exports from Satélite include classical tenor Rolando Villazón, the members of the band Café Tacvba, troubadour Fernando Delgadillo.
