= Marianne Gast =

German photographer, 1910–1958

Marianne Gast (Note: Also known by her married names Marianne Goeritz and Marianne von Campe, and the pseudonyms Matiana and Marianne Lukin.) (10 December 1910 – 1958) was a German photographer. She specialised in photographing architecture and works of art. For many years she was the primary photographer of works by the German-born artist Mathias Goeritz, her husband from 1942 to 1958. The majority of her archive is now held by the National Institute of Fine Arts in Mexico; other documents are held by the Lafuente Archive. In 2018 the first solo exhibition of Gast's work was displayed at the Centro de Documentación de la Imagen in Santander, Spain.

Gast was born in Schierke, Germany, and educated in England and France. During this period she began to practice photography. In 1942 she met the German-born painter and sculptor Mathias Goeritz in Tangier, when both were working at the Deutsche Akademie. They married the same year, and settled in Spain after the Second World War, living first in Granada, then Madrid. In 1948, the couple moved to Santillana del Mar because Gast had been commissioned to take photographs for a planned book on the town.

In 1949, Gast and Goeritz moved to Mexico, as Goeritz had been invited to teach at the new school of architecture in Guadalajara. In 1951, Gast became the head of the new José Maria Zepeda Estrada gallery in Guadalajara. In Mexico, Goeritz designed the contemporary art gallery El Eco, which was photographed extensively by Gast.

Gast and Goeritz separated; in 1958 she visited Easter Island without him to photograph the moai there. Later that year she returned to Germany, divorced Goeritz, and died of a brain tumour. At the end of her life she married her second husband, Carl von Campe. After her death, Goeritz wrote an article for Arquitectura/México, the magazine for which he had edited the visual arts section for many years, commemorating her.
