= CUAAD =

University college in Guadalajara, Mexico

Centro Universitario de Arte Arquitectura y Diseño; University Centre of Art, Architecture and Design
- Guadalajara, Jalisco; Mexico

Information
- Type: Public
- Head of school: Ernesto Flores Gallo
- Enrollment: 6,241 (in 2010)
- Campus: Huentitan; Santa Maria de Gracia; San Agustin
- Website: www.cuaad.udg.mx

University Centre of Art, Architecture and Design (Spanish: Centro Universitario de Arte, Arquitectura y Diseño), abbreviated as CUAAD, is a college located in Guadalajara, Mexico. It is the division of the University of Guadalajara where higher education related to arts, architecture, and design is provided. It was structured from the old faculties of the school of architecture (founded in 1948 by Ignacio Díaz Morales), as well as the school of plastic arts (founded in 1925 by Jorge Martinez), the school of music (founded in 1952), and school of design (founded in 1976).

== Campus ==
The campus is located in several places inside the municipality of Guadalajara:

- The main infrastructure is in Huentitan, at Huentitán el Bajo. The degrees offered at this facility are architecture, industrial design, fashion design, graphic design, interior design, urbanism, and audio-visual arts. The school was building opened in September 1969. This campus includes the Dr. Horst Hartung Franz Library.
- The School of Plastic Arts (Escuela de Artes Plásticas) is located at Ex Claustro de Santa María de Gracia in downtown Guadalajara. Degrees available at this campus are Contemporary Dance, Folklore Dance, Theater, Painting, Sculpture, Drawing and Stamp, and Photography.
- The School of Music (Escuela de Música) is located at Ex Claustro de San Agustín downtown. This campus offers Concert Soloist, Musical Pedagogy, Musical Composition, Choir Direction and Singing degrees.
