= Ignacio Díaz Morales =

Mexican architect (1905–1992)

- Born: Ignacio Díaz Morales y Álvarez Tostado; November 16, 1905; Guadalajara, Jalisco, Mexico
- Died: September 3, 1992 (aged 86); Mexico City, Mexico
- Burial place: Templo Expiatorio del Santísimo Sacramento
- Other name: Ignacio Díaz–Morales Álvarez–Tostado
- Occupations: Architect, civil engineer, educator, academic administrator
- Movement: Tapatia School of Architecture, Neoclassical
- Awards: National Prize for Arts and Sciences (Mexico) (1989)

Ignacio Díaz Morales (November 16, 1905 – September 3, 1992) was a Mexican architect, civil engineer, and educator. His work helped define contemporary architecture in the state of Jalisco. Díaz Morales was a founding member of the movement Tapatia School of Architecture, and in 1948 he founded the architecture department at the ITESO, Universidad Jesuita de Guadalajara (now part of CUAAD at University of Guadalajara).

== Early life and education ==
Ignacio Díaz Morales was born on November 16, 1905, in Guadalajara in Jalisco, Mexico, to parents Trinidad Álvarez Tostado and José Díaz Morales. His father was a lawyer and encouraged his education. He attended secondary school at Colegio de la Acción Católica de la Juventud Mexicana for a year in 1918, and continued at the Jesuit Institute of Sciences from 1919 to 1924. He was also a guest student at the Escuela de Arquitectura (English: School of Architecture) in Mexico City, from 1922 to 1924.

Díaz Morales studied at Escuela Libre de Ingenieros (English: Free Engineering School) in Guadalajara led by Ambrosio Ulloa, and graduated in 1928 as an architect and civil engineer. His classmates were Luis Barragán, Pedro Castellanos, and Rafael Urzúa.

== Career ==
From 1928 to 1936, the four students including Barragán, Díaz Morales, Castellanos, and Urzúa introduced a new type of architecture to the Jalisco region, called the Escuela Tapatía de Arquitectura (English: Tapatia School of Architecture). The architect group collectively embraced 'traditional modernity' a return to traditional values while also acknowledging contemporaneity principals.

Díaz Morales designed several train stations for the American railway company Ferrocarril del Pacífico from 1930 to 1938, including the Nogales, Ruiz, and Guaymas stations for the Sudpacífico Railway. From 1941 to 1943, he was president of the town planning authority of Guadalajara.

He founded the School of Architecture of the ITESO, Universidad Jesuita de Guadalajara in 1948 (now part of CUAAD at University of Guadalajara), where he brought together German and Austrian exiles after World War II, such as Mathias Goeritz, and Erich Coufal Díaz Morales served as director of the school department from its beginning in 1948 until 1963.

He was an honorary member of the American Institute of Architects, as well as was awarded the National Academy of Architecture Award in 1986, and the National Prize for Arts and Sciences award in 1989.

== Death and legacy ==
Díaz Morales died on September 3, 1992, in Mexico City. He is buried in a crypt at Templo Expiatorio del Santísimo Sacramento, a church in Guadalajara.

== See also ==
- Architecture of Mexico
