= Torres de Satélite =

Urban monumental sculpture in State of Mexico, Mexico

Satellite Towers
- Torres de Satélite (Spanish)
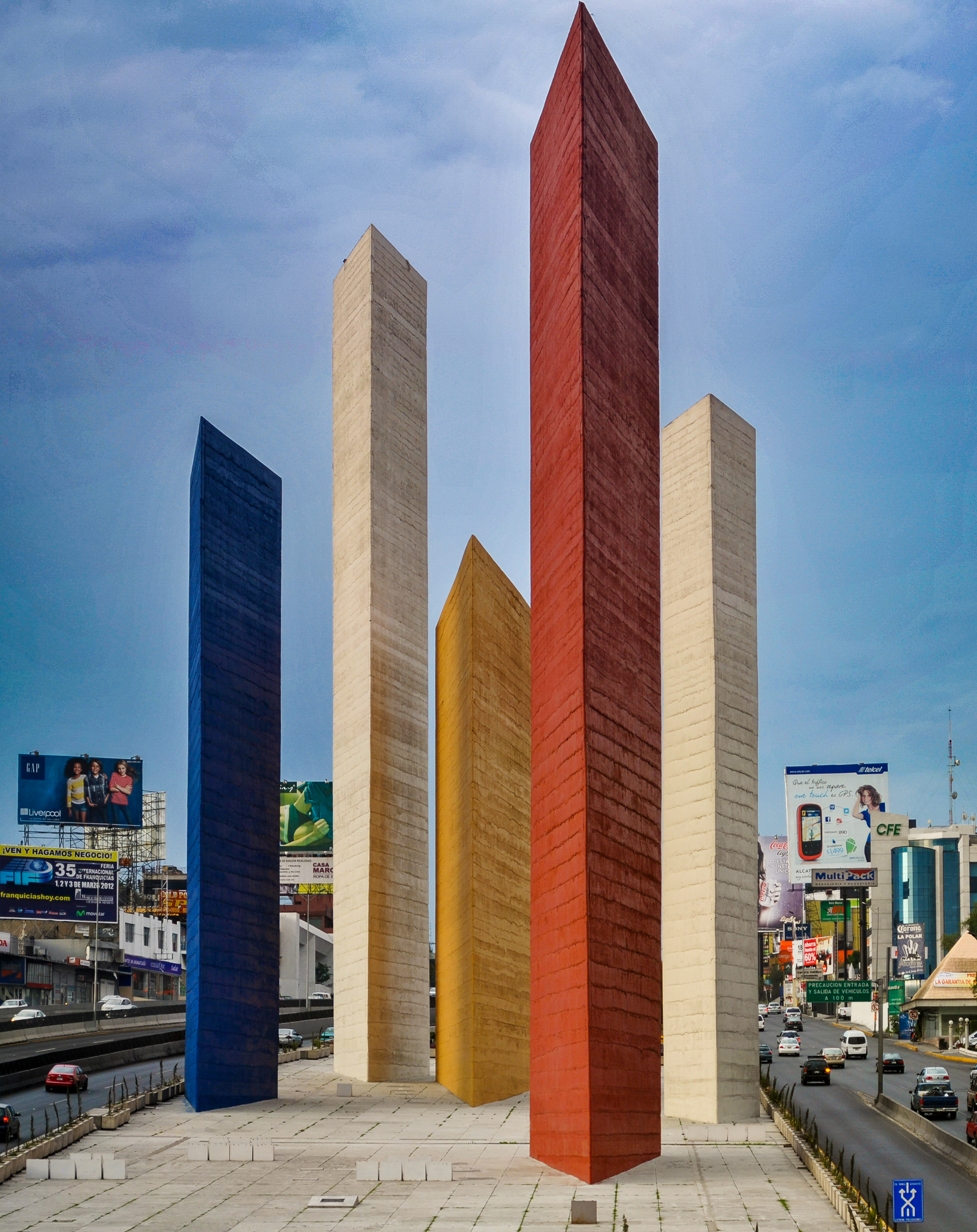
- View of the Torres de Satélite in 2012
- Interactive map of Satellite Towers
- 19°29′57.30″N 99°14′12.70″W
- Location: Ciudad Satélite, State of Mexico, Mexico

History
- Groundbreaking: 1957
- Built: March 1958

Site notes
- Elevation: 30 to 52 m.
- Architect(s): Luis Barragán; Mathias Goeritz
- Restored: 2008
- Governing body: Naucalpan Municiplity

The Torres de Satélite ("Satellite Towers") are a group of sculptures located in the Ciudad Satélite district of Naucalpan, State of Mexico. One of the country's first urban sculptures of great dimensions, had its planning started in 1957 with the ideas of renowned Mexican architect Luis Barragán, painter Jesús Reyes Ferreira and sculptor Mathias Goeritz. The project was originally planned to be composed of seven towers, with the tallest one reaching a height of 200 meters (about 650 feet), but a budget reduction forced the design to be composed of only five towers, with the tallest measuring 52 meters (170 feet) and the shortest 30 meters (98 feet).

Goeritz originally wanted the towers to be painted in different shades of orange, but changed his mind later due to some pressure from constructors and investors. It was finally decided that there would be one tower each in red, blue and yellow, the primary subtractive colors, and two in white.

Thus, in the first days of March 1958, the Satélite Towers were inaugurated as the symbol of the newborn and modern Ciudad Satélite.

== In popular culture ==
The towers appear prominently in the surrealist film The Holy Mountain by Alejandro Jodorowsky. The unnamed protagonist is hoisted up the red tower, which he then enters via a circular hole in its side (painted on for the purposes of the film). Within he encounters an Alchemist, and begins a metaphysical transformation.

The Towers are also featured in the Fool Again music video by the Irish pop Boy Band group Westlife.

Additionally, they are featured in comic book #14 of Marvel Comics' Champions series; likely an artistic choice made by penciller Humberto Ramos.

== See also ==
- Faro del Comercio
