= Luis Barragán =

Mexican architect (1902-1988)

- Barragán in 1960s.
- Born: March 9, 1902; Guadalajara, Jalisco, Mexico
- Died: November 22, 1988 (aged 86); Mexico City, Mexico
- Occupation: Architect
- Known for: Architecture
- Awards: Pritzker Prize
- Buildings: Torres de Satélite, Casa Gilardi, Barragán House, Jardines de Pedregal Subdivision

Luis Ramiro Barragán Morfín (March 9, 1902 – November 22, 1988) was a Mexican architect and engineer. His work has influenced contemporary architects visually and conceptually. Barragán's buildings are frequently visited by international students and professors of architecture. He studied as an engineer in his home town, while undertaking the entirety of additional coursework to obtain the title of architect.

Barragán won the Pritzker Prize, the highest award in architecture, in 1980, and his personal home, the Luis Barragán House and Studio, was declared a UNESCO World Heritage Site in 2004.

== Early life ==
Barragán was born in Guadalajara in Jalisco, Mexico. Educated as an engineer, he graduated from the Escuela Libre de Ingenieros in Guadalajara in 1923. After graduation, he traveled through Spain and France. While in France he became aware of the writings of Ferdinand Bac, a German-French writer, designer and artist whom Barragán cited throughout his life. In 1931, he again traveled to France with a long stop-over in New York. In this trip he met Mexican mural painter José Clemente Orozco, architectural magazine editors, and Frederick Kiesler. In France he briefly met Le Corbusier and finally visited the gardens realized by Ferdinand Bac. He practiced architecture in Guadalajara from 1927–1936, and in Mexico City thereafter.

== Career ==
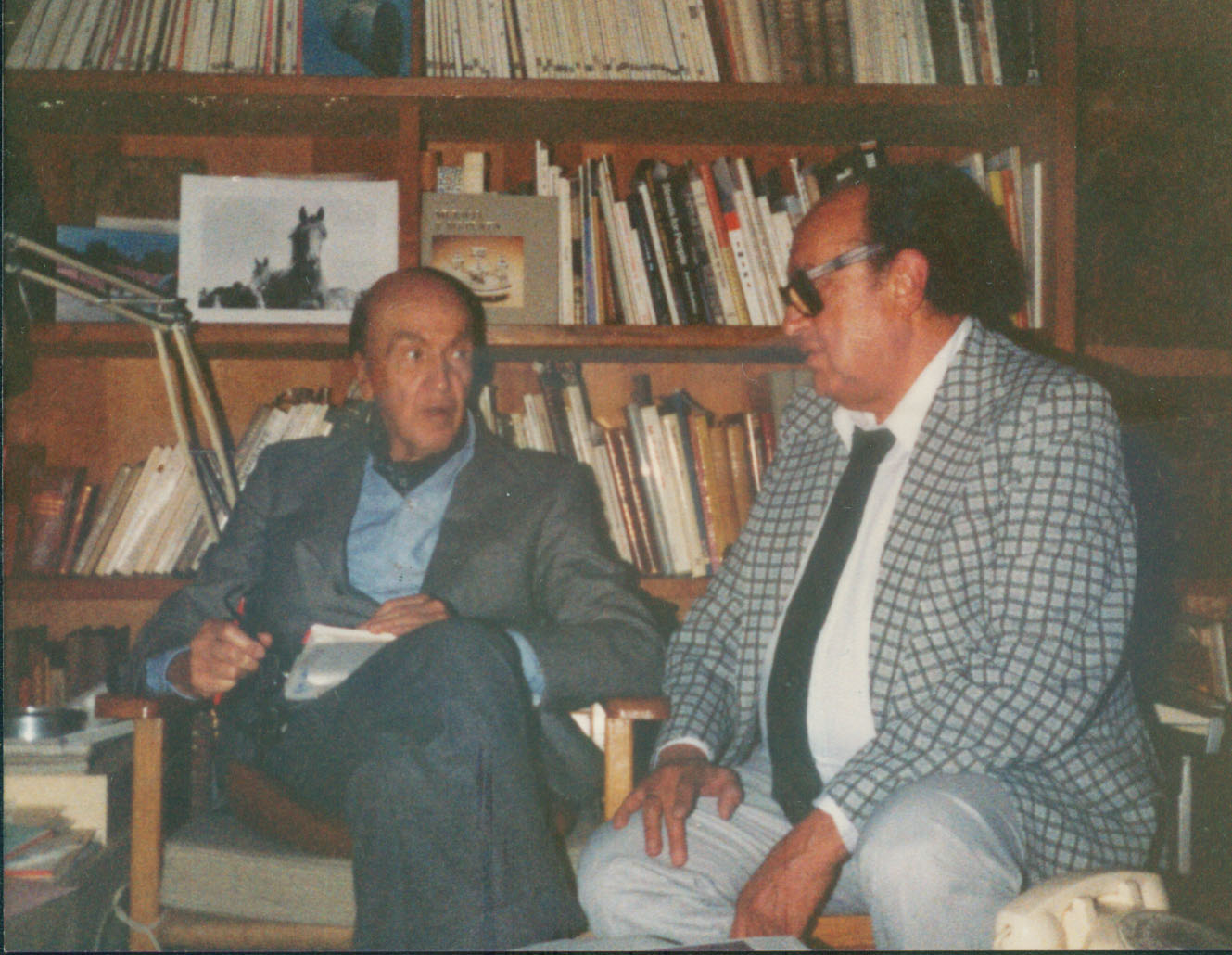
Luis Barragán and José Luis Hernández Mendoza

His Guadalajara work includes over a dozen private homes in the Colonia Americana area of what is today near downtown Guadalajara. These homes, within walking distance of each other, include Barragán's earliest residential projects. One of his first buildings, Casa Cristo, was restored and houses the state's Architects' Guild. The first four houses that Barragan were already contemporary architecture.

=== Major projects ===
In 1945 he started planning the residential development of Jardines del Pedregal, Mexico City. In 1947 he built his own house and studio in Tacubaya and in 1955 he rebuilt the Convento de las Capuchinas Sacramentarias in Tlalpan, Mexico City, and the plan for Jardines del Bosque in Guadalajara. In 1957 he planned Torres de Satélite (an urban sculpture created in collaboration with sculptor Mathias Goeritz) and an exclusive residential area, Las Arboledas, a few kilometers away from Ciudad Satélite. In 1964 he designed, alongside architect Juan Sordo Madaleno, the Lomas Verdes residential area, also near the Satélite area, in the municipality of Naucalpan, Estado de México. In 1967 he created one of his best-known works, the San Cristóbal Estates equestrian development in Mexico City.

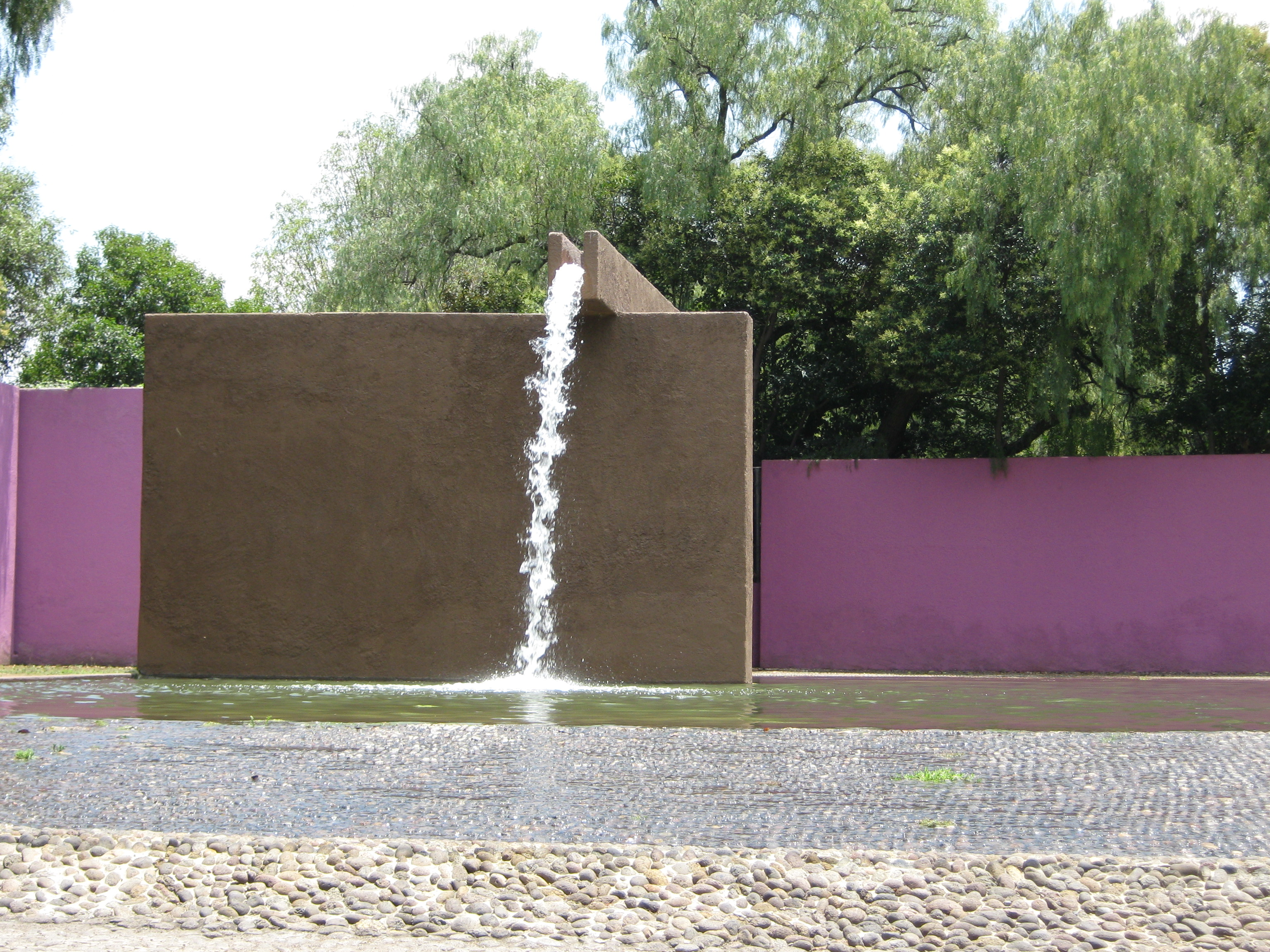
Fuente de los Amantes

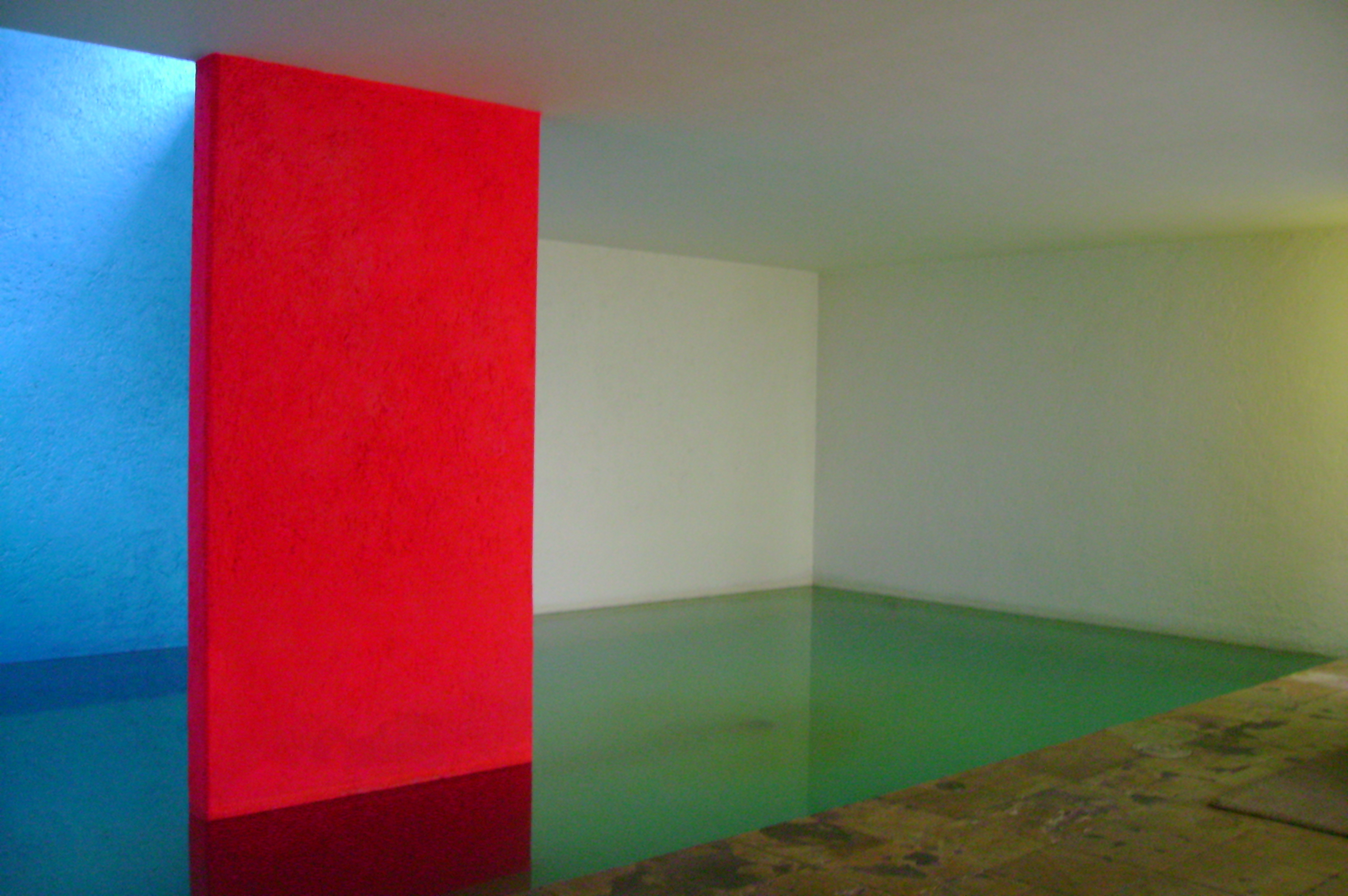
Casa Gilardi

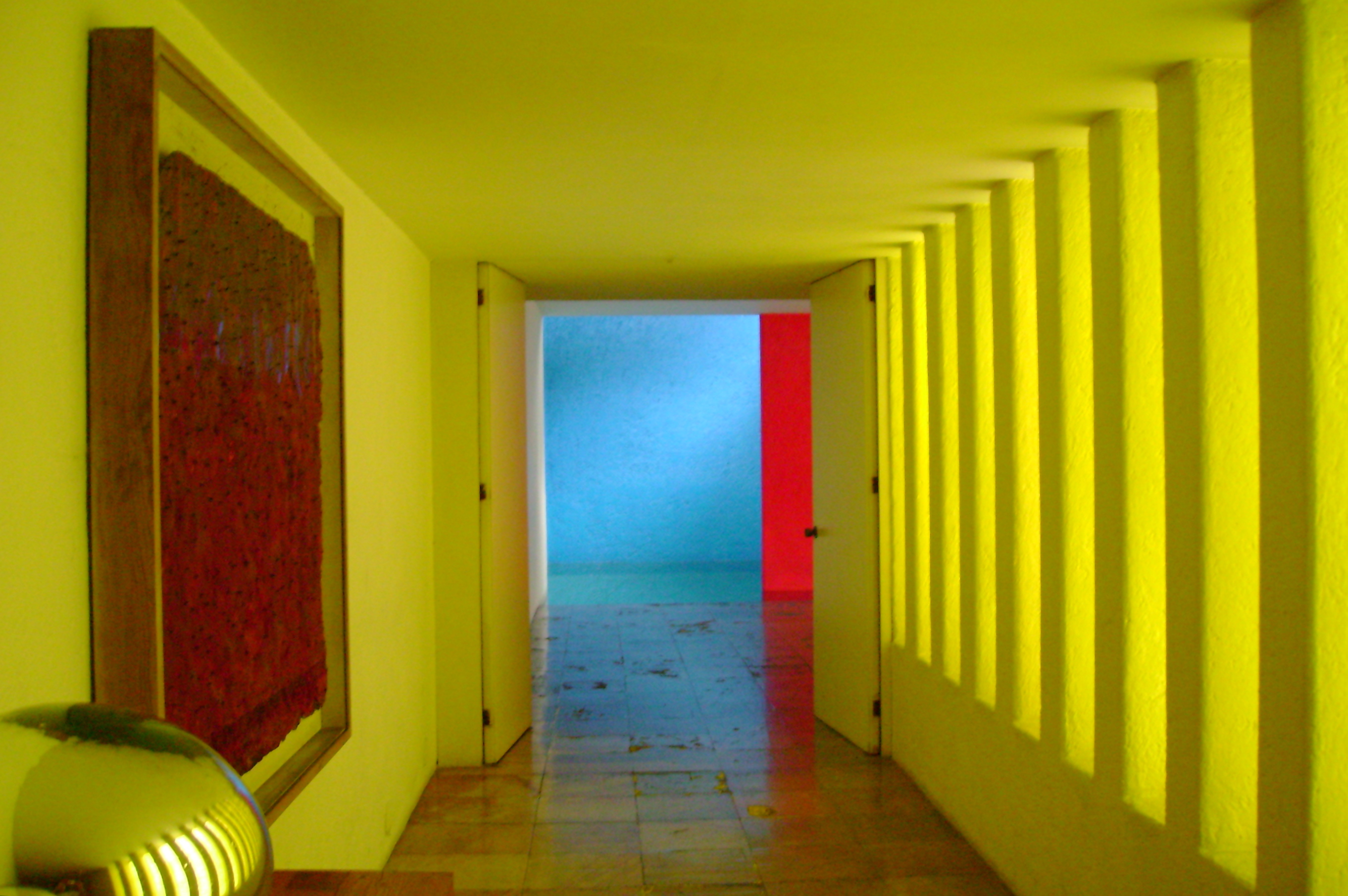
Casa Gilardi

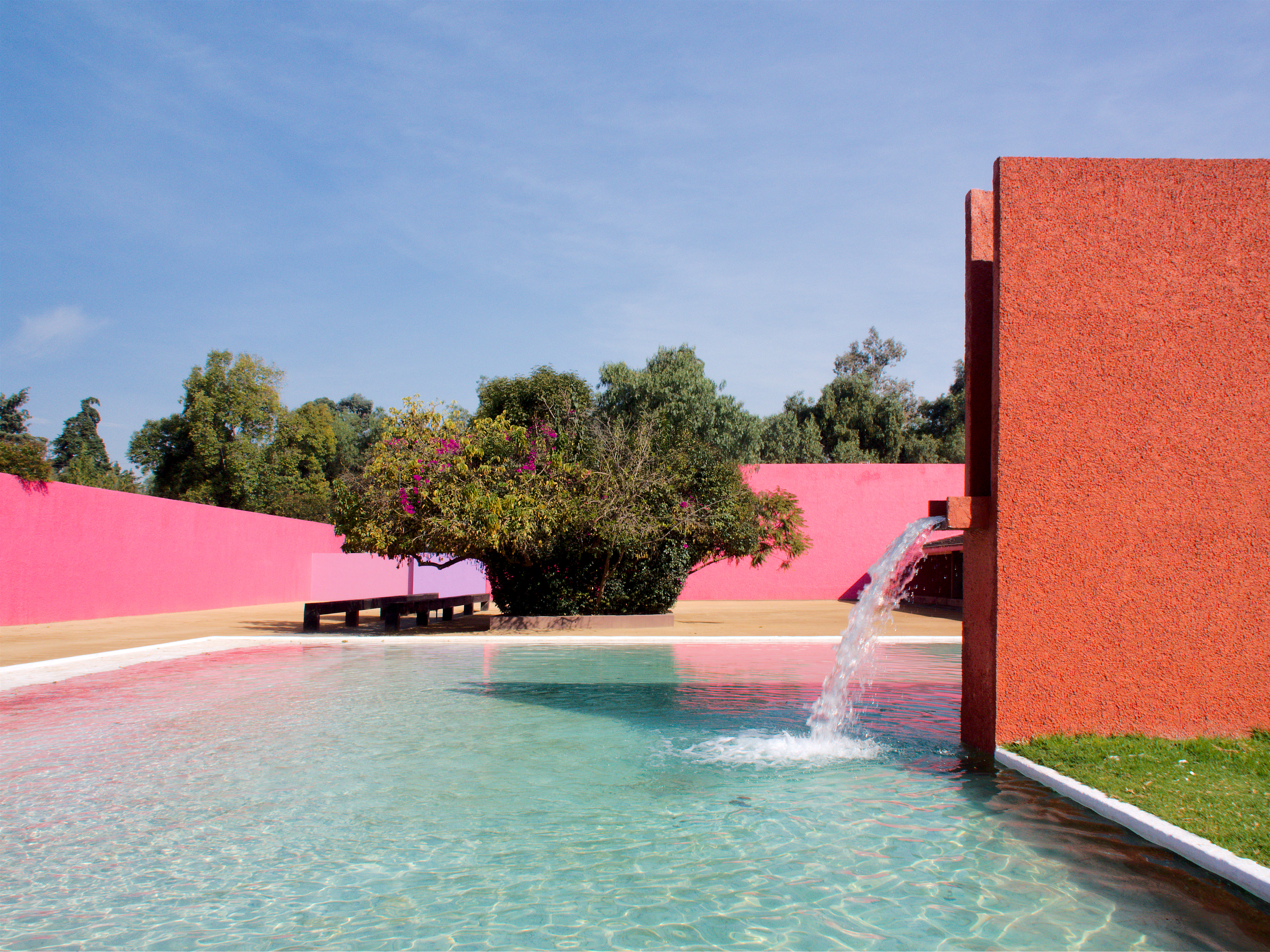
San Cristóbal Estates

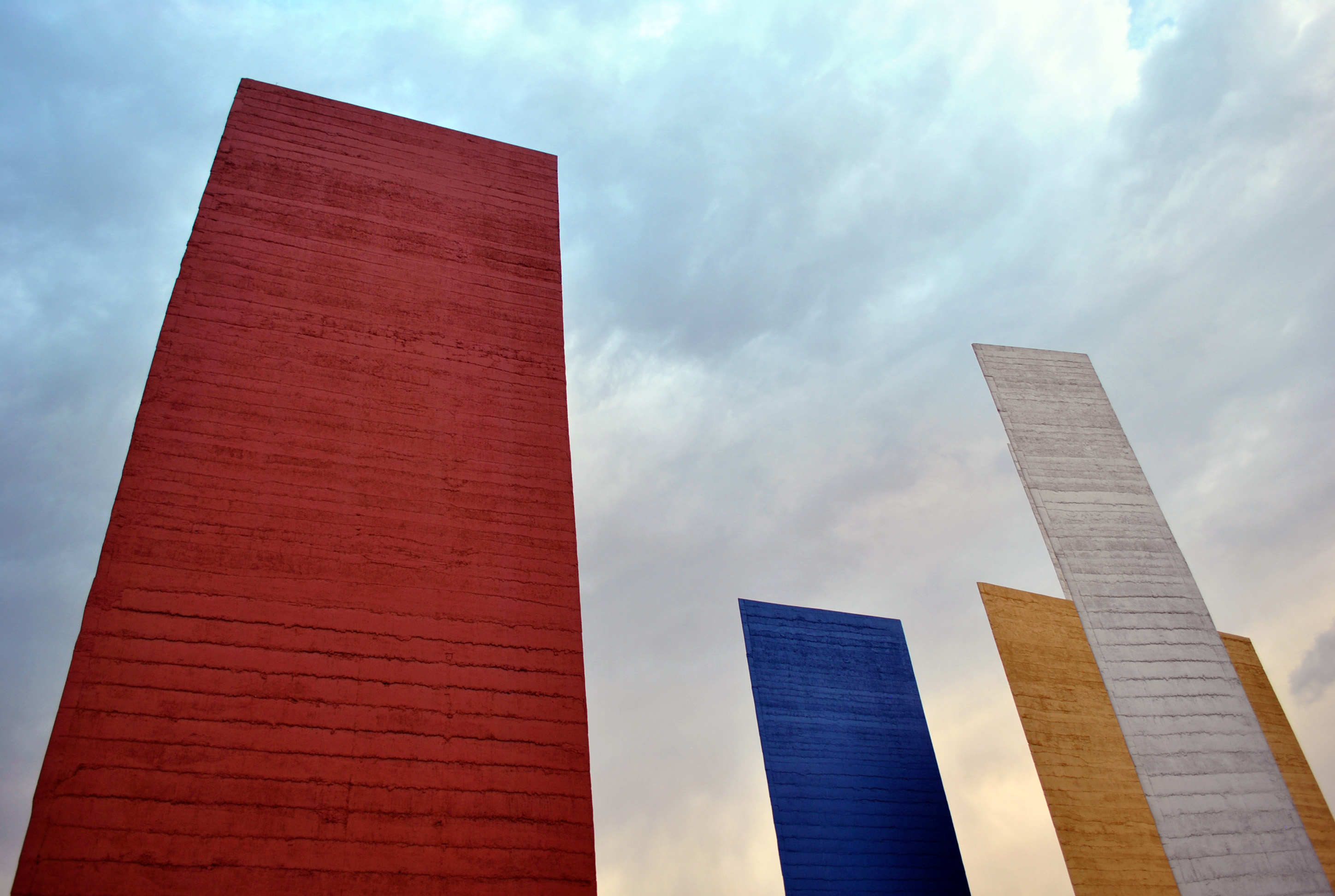
Torres de Satélite (in collaboration with sculptor Mathias Goeritz)

=== Barragán and the Modernist movement ===
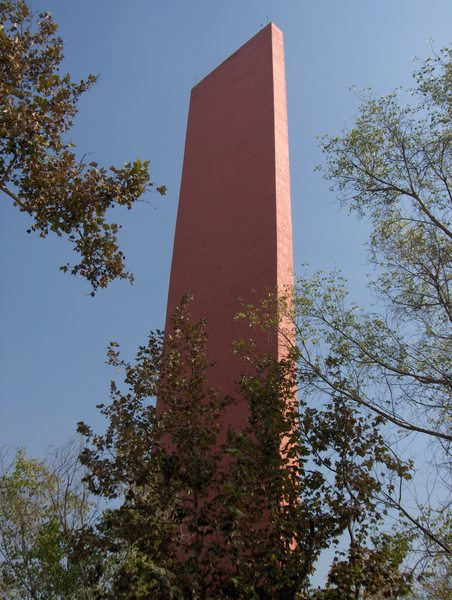
Faro de Comercio

Barragán visited Le Corbusier and became influenced by European modernism. The buildings he produced in the years after his return to Mexico show the typical clean lines of the Modernist movement. Nonetheless, according to Andrés Casillas (who worked with Barragán), he eventually became entirely convinced that the house should not be "a machine for living." Opposed to functionalism, Barragán strove for an "emotional architecture" claiming that "any work of architecture which does not express serenity is a mistake." Barragán used raw materials such as stone or wood. He combined them with an original and dramatic use of light, both natural and artificial; his preference for hidden light sources gives his interiors a particularly subtle and lyrical atmosphere.

== Honors ==
Barragán worked for years with little acknowledgement or praise until 1975 when he was honored with a retrospective at the Museum of Modern Art in New York City. In 1980, he became the second winner of the Pritzker Architecture Prize. His house and studio, built in 1948 in Mexico City, were listed as a UNESCO World Heritage site in 2004.

== Influence ==
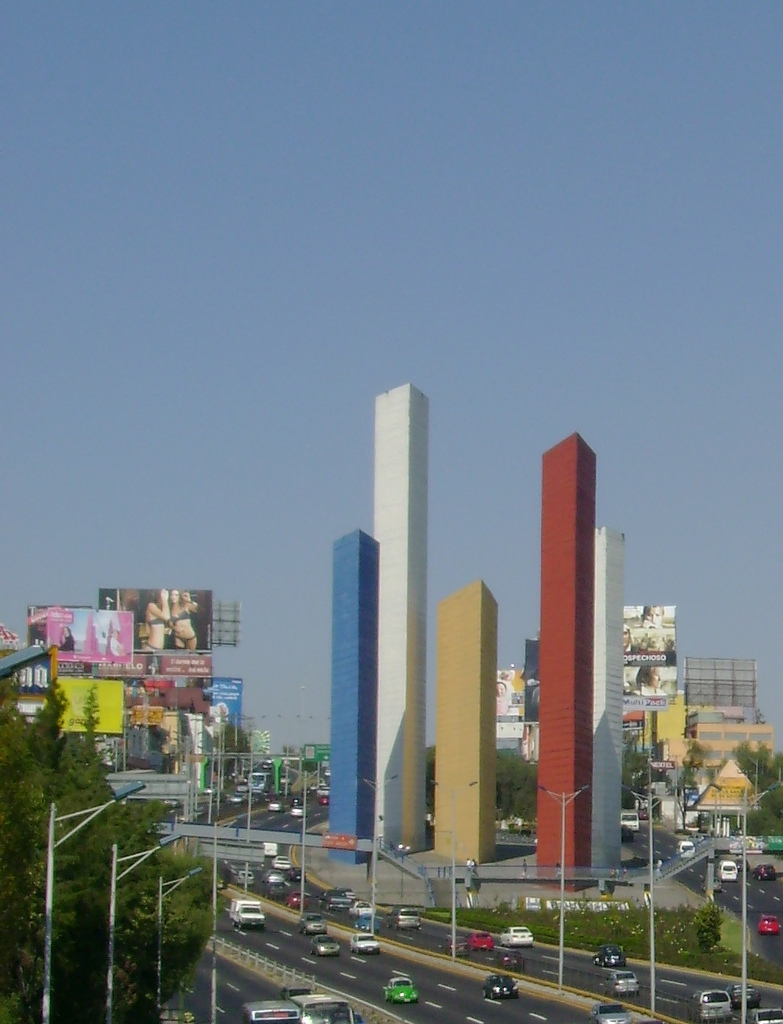
Torres de Satélite, Mexico City (1957–58), in collaboration with Mathias Goeritz

The work of Luis Barragán is often (and misleadingly) quoted in reference to minimalist architecture. John Pawson, in his book Minimum, includes images from some of Barragán's projects. Most architects who do minimalistic architecture do not use color, but the ideas of forms and spaces which Barragán pioneered are still there. There have been several essays written by the Pritzker Prize recipient Alvaro Siza in prefaces to books that make reference to the ideas of Barragán.

Louis Kahn informally consulted Barragán on the space between the buildings of the Salk Institute in La Jolla, California. According to the documents, Kahn's original idea was to place a garden between the buildings; however, Barragán suggested that an open plaza, with only a water feature in between, would better reflect the spirit of the location. This area, possibly designed with Barragán's advice in mind, is arguably the most impressive aspect of the building complex. He was a highly recognized consultor by many Mexican and International architects on landscape design, as he had a particular ability to envision the outdoor spaces and their relation to their interior paradigms and the natural context characteristics.

Barragán's influence can be seen in the work of many of Mexico's contemporary architects, especially in Ricardo Legorreta's projects. One of the projects, where Barragán's concepts and colors inspired Legorreta, is the Hotel Camino Real in Polanco, Mexico City. This project reflects the importance of the native culture and its intersection with an elegant modern design.

== Legacy ==
Barragán died at the age of eighty-six in Mexico City. In his will, he designated three people to manage his legacy: Ignacio Díaz Morales, Óscar Ignacio González, and Raúl Ferrera. Ignacio Díaz Morales, a friend and fellow architect, was bequeathed Barragán's library. He was tasked with choosing an institution suitable for receiving the book collection. Óscar Ignacio González, a childhood friend, received Barragán's personal objects. Raúl Ferrera, his business partner, received the archives and the copyright to the work. Díaz Morales established the Fundación de Arquitectura Tapatía, a private foundation managed by the Casa Barragán, in co-ownership with the Government of the State of Jalisco. The house is now a museum which celebrates Barragán and serves as a conduit between scholars and architects interested in visiting other Barragán buildings in Mexico. UNESCO added the Casa Luis Barragán to its World Heritage List in 2004.

Following Raúl Ferrera's death in 1993, the archives and related copyright became the property of Mr. Ferrera's widow who, after having unsuccessfully tried to find a collector or institution willing to keep these in Mexico, decided to sell them to the Max Protetch Gallery in New York. The documents were offered to a number of prospective clients, among them the Vitra Design Museum, which in 1994 was planning an exhibition dedicated to Luis Barragán. Following the Vitra company's policy of collecting objects and archives of design and architecture, the archives were finally acquired in their entirety and transferred to the Barragán Foundation in Switzerland. Among the holdings in the archive are thirteen and a half thousand drawings, seventy-seven hundred photographic prints, eighty-two photographic panels, seventy- eight hundred slides, two hundred and ninety publications concerning Barragán’s work, fifty-four publications collected by Barragán, seven files of clippings, seven architectural models, several files of manuscripts, notes, lists, and correspondence, and also pieces of furniture and other objects.

The Barragan Foundation is a not-for-profit institution based in Birsfelden, Switzerland. Since 1996, it manages the archives of Luis Barragán, and in 1997 acquired the negatives of the photographer Armando Salas Portugal documenting Barragán's work. The Foundation's mission is to spread the knowledge on Luis Barragán's cultural legacy by means of preserving and studying his archives and related historical sources, producing publications and exhibitions, providing expertise and assistance to further institutions and scholarly researches. The Barragán Foundation owns complete rights to the work of Luis Barragán and to the related photos by Armando Salas Portugal.

== Important works ==
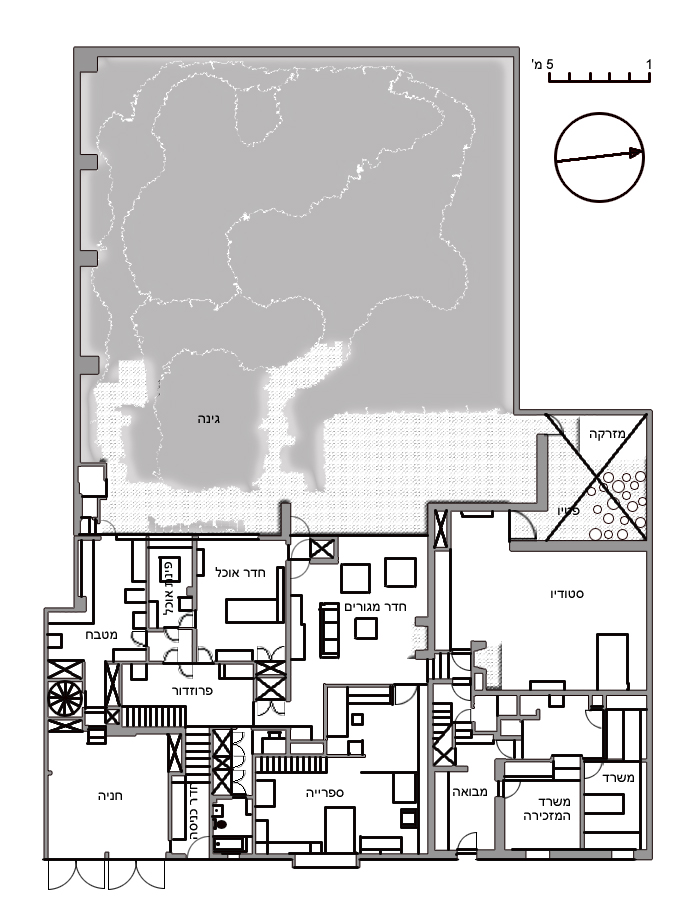
House for the architect / Barragán House

All finished projects by Barragán are located in Mexico.

- Las Arboledas / North of Mexico City (1955–1961)
- House for the architect / Barragán House, Mexico City (1947–48)
- Jardines del Pedregal Subdivision, Mexico City (1945–53)
- Tlalpan Chapel, Tlalpan, Mexico City (1954–60)
- Gálvez House, Mexico City (1955)
- Jardines del Bosque Subdivision, Guadalajara (1955–58)
- Torres de Satélite, Mexico City (1957–58), in collaboration with Mathias Goeritz
- Cuadra San Cristóbal, Los Clubes, Mexico City (1966–68)
- Gilardi House, Mexico City (1975–77)
- Cuernavaca Racquet Club, Cuernavaca, Morelos, Mexico (1976-1980)

=== Luis Barragán House and Studio ===
Luis Barragán set up his studio in Mexico City, the building is currently a museum, but with tours available only by appointment. The building is from 1948 reflecting Barragán's preferred style, where he lived his whole life. Today is owned by Jalisco and the Arquitectura Tapatía Luis Barragán Foundation. The site became World Heritage Site by UNESCO in 2004.

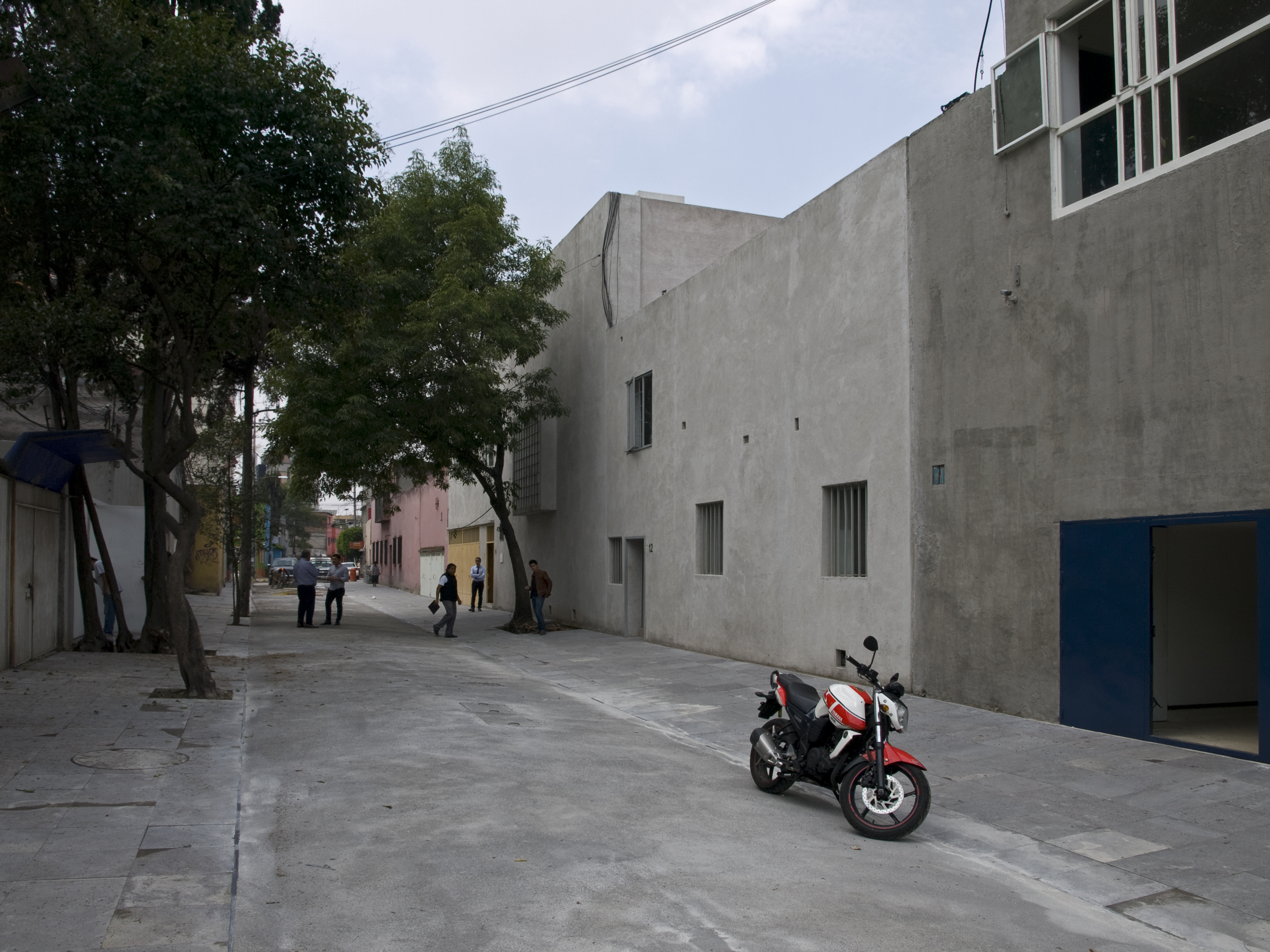

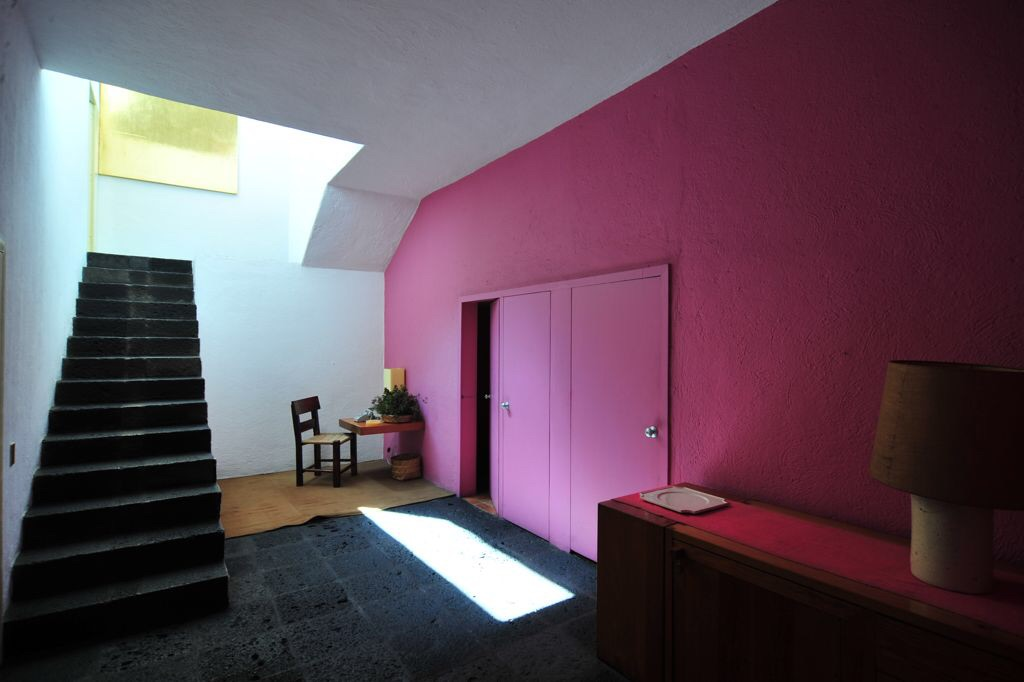

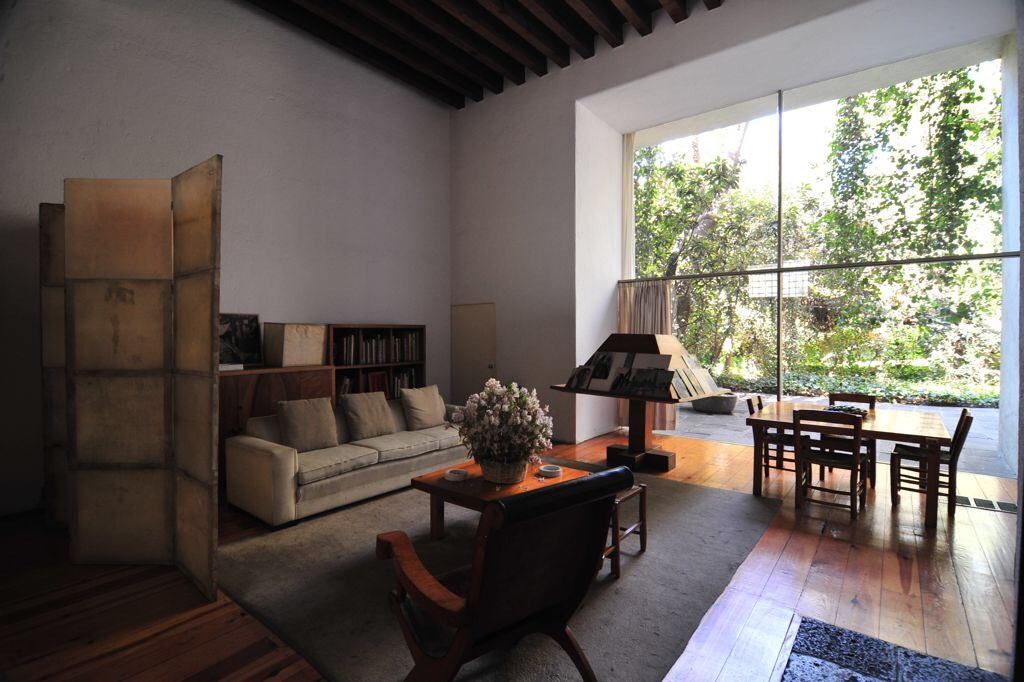

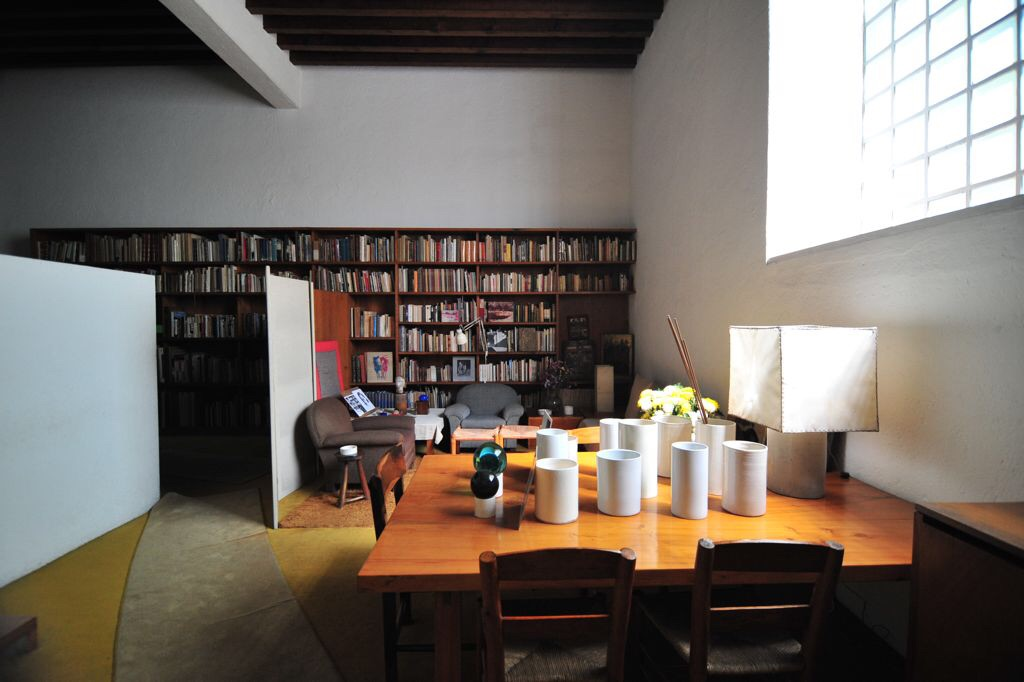

== In popular culture ==
In Tite Kubo's manga series Bleach, the character Baraggan Louisenbarn is named after Luis Barragán.
