= Colonia Ampliación Daniel Garza =

Colonia Ampliación Daniel Garza is a colonia in Delegación Miguel Hidalgo of Mexico City, part of that in its time was the old Villa de Tacubaya.

- Avenida Constituyentes to the north, bordering the Bosque de Chapultepec.
- Avenida Parque Lira to the east, bordering San Miguel Chapultepec.
- General Sóstenes Rocha, bordering Observatorio al Sur.
- General José Montesinos street, bordering Daniel Garza al Poniente.

The streets of the colonia bear the names of generals and governors of Mexico as well as their neighbor San Miguel Chapultepec.

== History ==
This colony emerged in the mid-twentieth century, when the ancient and wealthy residents of the Villa de Tacubaya moved to areas such as Las Lomas de Chapultepec; Polanco and Condesa, working-class people settled there, becoming a place surrounded by sawmills, workshops, shops and inns; for this reason at some time Constituyentes Avenue was known as Calzada Madereros. In part of its land are the facilities of the Miguel Hidalgo delegation, the colonia is divided into two by the Peripheral Ring, being a major urban development in the vicinity of San Miguel Chapultepec. In the Poniente area, it has the Faro del saber Constituyentes. Through its streets (José Morán) passes the new Polanco-Condesa cycleway and the cycleway Observatorio - Condesa, it is intended to turn the area into a cultural corridor, because the house - workshop Luis Barragán is located there.

== Places of interest ==
This colony has benefited from the real estate boom that the San Miguel Chapultepec colony has suffered in the last decade, besides having within its limits, in General Francisco Ramírez street, important galleries such as Labor, Archivo Diseño y Arquitectura, La Casa Ortega (first work of the architect Luis Barragán) and the Casa Luis Barragán, one of the most influential and representative works of contemporary architecture in the world, recognized by UNESCO as one of the 31 areas classified as a World Heritage Site in Mexico. It is the only individual property in Latin America that has achieved such distinction.

== Gallery route ==
It has been carried out since 2012 with the aim of creating a cultural corridor similar to the Roma - Condesa, this has led to the rehabilitation of the underground passage adjacent to the exit of the metro constituents.

== Public transport ==
In the limits of the colony the stations are located Constituyentes of Line 7 and Tacubaya of 1, 7 and 9, in addition to the Parque Lira station of metrobus Line 2.
