= Liv Vaisberg =

Rotterdam-based cultural strategist and curator

- Born: Cannes, France
- Education: King's College London; Panthéon-Sorbonne University; College of Europe
- Occupations: Cultural strategist; Curator; Art fair founder; Consultant
- Years active: 2008–present
- Known for: Co-founder of COLLECTIBLE; Design Biennale Rotterdam; A Performance Affair; Huidenclub; Poppositions
- Website: livvaisberg.com

Liv Vaisberg is a Rotterdam-based cultural strategist, curator, and co-founder of several influential art and design initiatives. Known for her work at the intersection of contemporary art, performance, and design, she has played a pivotal role in shaping new platforms for presenting and supporting artistic practices in Europe and internationally.

== Biography ==
Liv Vaisberg was born in Cannes, France. She studied international and European law at King's College London, Panthéon-Sorbonne University in Paris, and the College of Europe in Bruges. She began her career as a consultant and legal adviser for the creative industries.

Now based in Rotterdam, Netherlands, Vaisberg works across the cultural sector in roles spanning curatorial direction, cultural entrepreneurship, and strategic consultancy. Her projects often explore alternative models of exhibition-making, hybrid cultural events, and interdisciplinary collaborations. She was the inaugural director of the Brussels edition of the Independent Art Fair, introducing the New York format to a European context.

In 2017, she founded the Liv Vaisberg Office for Art & Design, a consultancy offering curatorial and strategic support to cultural institutions, art fairs, and design studios.

== Early initiatives ==
In 2008, Vaisberg co-founded the Charleroi Safari with Nicolas Buissart. This urban safari concept went viral after being featured in international media, highlighting the creative potential of Charleroi, which had been described in the Dutch press as "the ugliest city in the world".

== Projects ==
Vaisberg is the co-founder of several noted initiatives:

- Design Biennale Rotterdam: Co-founded with Sarah Schulten, this biennial event held its first edition in 2025, presenting experimental design across 25 venues in Rotterdam. It focused on themes such as diaspora, heritage, and future-oriented design. Supported by Het Nieuwe Instituut, Museum Boijmans Van Beuningen, and Kunsthal Rotterdam, the event aimed to increase public accessibility to contemporary design.
- COLLECTIBLE: A fair for contemporary collectible design co-founded in Brussels in 2018 with Clélie Debehault. COLLECTIBLE gained international acclaim and expanded to New York City in 2024.
- Huidenclub: Founded in 2020 during the COVID-19 pandemic, the Huidenclub is a space for contemporary culture in a former Rotterdam tannery, designed by Tomas Dirrix. It combines exhibitions, performances, and workspaces, fostering critical reflection and community engagement.
- A Performance Affair: Co-founded with William Kerr in Brussels, this fair was created to support performance artists and develop market mechanisms for performance-based work. It received international press attention, including front-page coverage in the New York Times International Edition.
- Poppositions: An alternative Brussels art fair launched in 2012 that focused on emerging artists and curatorial innovation. It was placed on hold in 2019.

== Recognition ==
Vaisberg’s work has been featured in major design and art media including Dezeen, The Art Newspaper, Wallpaper*, and Forbes. She is regularly invited to speak at cultural forums, art fairs, and conferences on the future of curating, design, and performance-based practice.
