= Tacubaya =

- Neighborhood of Mexico City
- Seal
- Location in Mexico City
- Coordinates: 19.4016398°N 99.1883337°W
- Country: Mexico
- City: Mexico City
- Municipality: Miguel Hidalgo

Population (2005)- only Colonia Tacubaya
  - Total: 7,964

Tacubaya
- Municipality of Mexico
- 16th century–1928
- History
  - Established: 16th century
  - Disestablished: 1928
Preceded by	Succeeded by
Atlacuihuayan	Central Department (Mexico)

Tacubaya (Nahuatl: Atlacuihuayan) is a working-class area of Mexico City in the borough of Miguel Hidalgo. The colonia Tacubaya and adjacent areas in other colonias are collectively referred to as Tacubaya. San Miguel Chapultepec sección II, Observatorio, Daniel Garza, and Ampliación Daniel Garza are also considered part of Tacubaya.

The area has been inhabited since the fifth century BC. Its name comes from Nahuatl, meaning "where water is gathered." From the colonial period to the beginning of the 20th century, Tacubaya was a separate entity to Mexico City and many of the city's wealthy residents, including viceroys, built residences there to enjoy the area's scenery. From the mid-19th century on, Tacubaya began to urbanize both due to the growth of Mexico City and the growth of its own population. Along with this urbanization, the area has degraded into one of the poorer sections of the city and contains the La Ciudad Perdida (The Lost City), a shantytown where people live in shacks of cardboard and other materials. Many of the mansions that were built here in the 19th century remain, such as the Casa Amarilla and Casa de la Bola, but most Mexico City residents are familiar with it due to its transportation hub on Avenida Jalisco where the Metro, Metrobus and many street buses converge.

Tacubaya was designated a "Barrio Mágico" in 2011.

== History ==
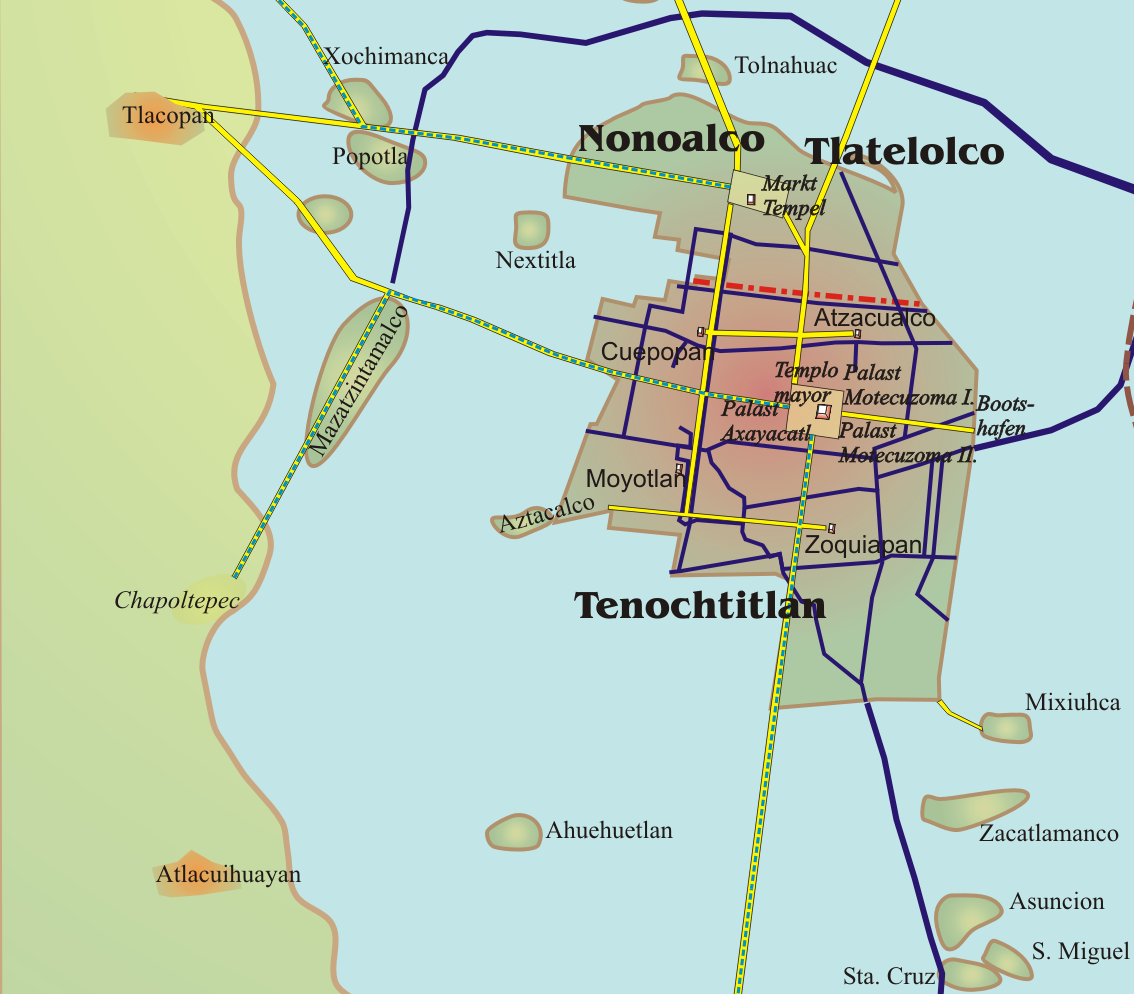
Map showing the location of Tacubaya from Tenochtitlan or the historic center of Mexico City

Glyph of Tacubaya, based on the one shown in the Codex Mendoza.

Archeological evidence shows continuous human habitation here since between 450 and 250 BCE by the Chichimecas. This prehistoric settlement eventually divided into a ceremonial center in the north and housing in the south, showing signs of influence from the Teotihuacan culture. The Mexica first arrived in 1276 but then left in 1279, when they moved on to Chapultepec. Its original Nahuatl name was Acozcomac, later renamed Atlalcuihaya. The name comes from Nahuatl and means “where water is gathered.” The second name was Hispanicized to Tacubaya when the Spanish built a monastery here called San José de Tacubaya in the early colonial period.

The area was important to the Spaniards in the early colonial period. After the Conquest, the Spanish founded several churches, monasteries and large mansions in this area. Viceroys spent time here because of its natural beauty. As a result, the area quickly became divided between the rich and poor. Tacubaya consisted of wide, flat land and had free flowing rivers that supplied fresh water to Mexico City. Moving the capital of New Spain from Mexico City (now the historic center) to Tacubaya was considered early in the colonial period but it never happened. After the end of the Mexican War of Independence in the 19th century, Tacubaya remained a popular getaway for the wealthy. Over the 19th century, as communal property rights were dismantled in favor of private property, many of the well-to-do bought land here for second homes, making it a summer-home suburb of Mexico City.

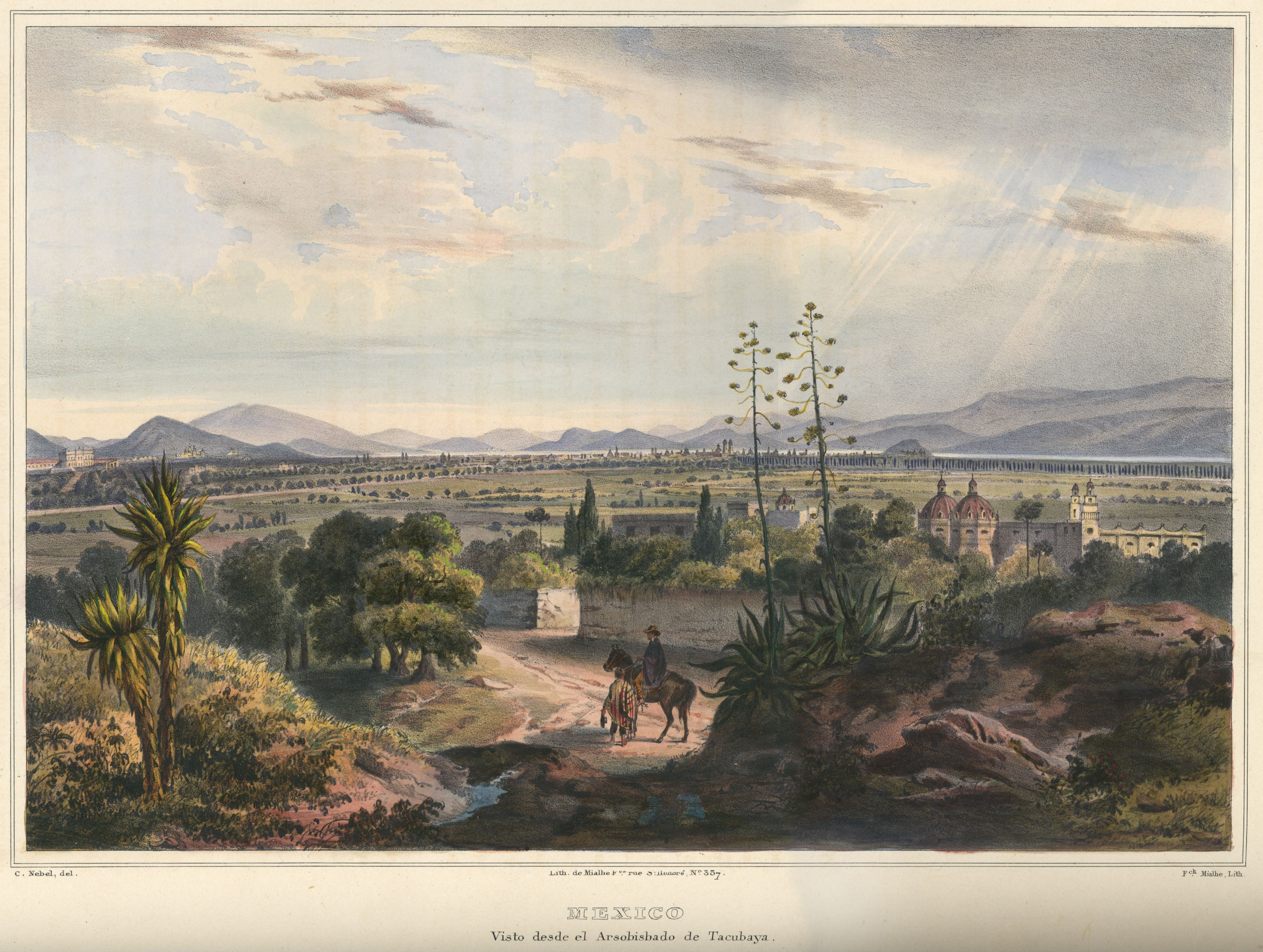
Mexico City as seen from Tacubaya 1836 by Carl Nebel

This was the scene of the Plan of Tacubaya which set off the Reform War. In 1861, Benito Juárez named it Tacubaya de los Mártires (of the Martyrs) in honor of those who lost their lives on 11 April 1859 in the aftermath of the Battle of Tacubaya.

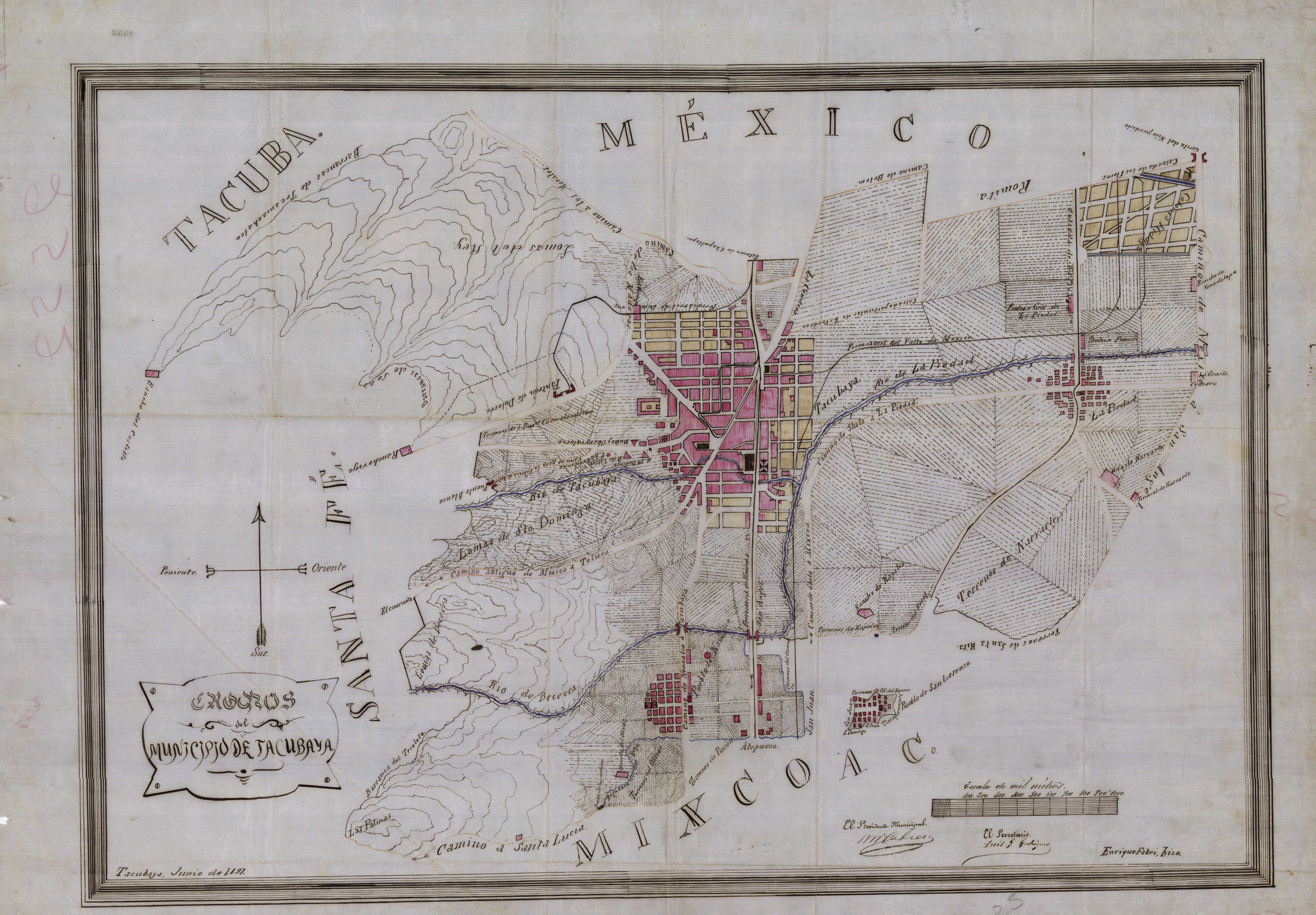
Tacubaya municipality in 1897

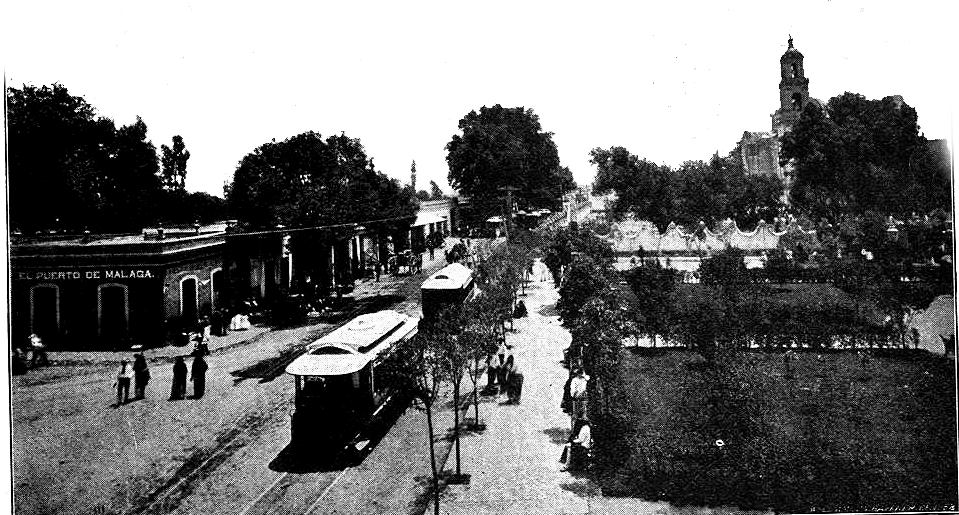
Tacubaya Alameda in 1909

Tacubaya remained a mostly rural suburb of Mexico City until the second half of the 19th century. The urbanization of Tacubaya was a gradual process that occurred from this time until about 1930. This urbanization was the result of both the growth of Tacubaya's population and the growth of Mexico City proper, both of which changed the economic, transportation and political scene here. Community property was dismantled in favor of private property by the Liberals in order to promote economic development. This brought foreign investment which led to the establishment of immigrant communities, mostly of Spaniards. This pushed the indigenous population to the periphery of the municipality. Development of the economy led to the establishment of rail and trolley lines, as well as streets and roads for automobiles. The creation of the Departmento del Distrito Federal eliminated the municipal government structure here, and integrated the area politically with the city. Eventually, Tacubaya became an important commercial center for Mexico City, linking the city with the west of the country. In the early 20th century, the first tall structure of the Mexico City area was built here, called the Ermita Conjunto or Triángulo de Tacubaya, which was at the vanguard architecturally at the time in Art Deco style. For many years, this building housed the Cine Hipódromo and the Teatro Hipódromo. Other major constructions such as El Jardin followed, transforming the formally-rural nature of the area.

The main river through here is the Tacubaya River, but since the 1970s this river has been channelled into tunnels underneath the streets.

Tacubaya is the home of singer Javier Solís and boxer Finito López. Films such as Los Olvidados, Amores Perros, and Perfume de Violetas have been shot here.

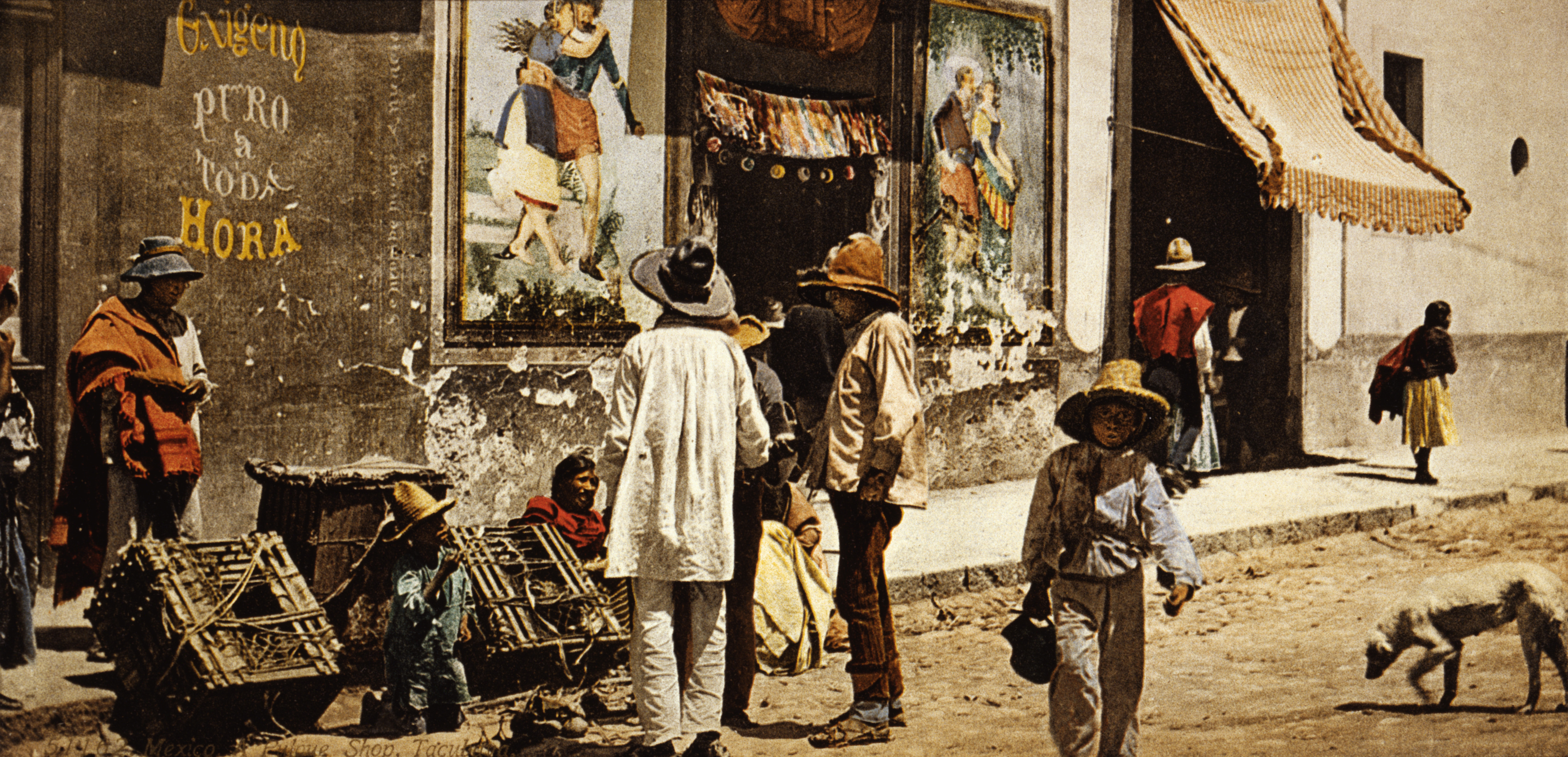
Pulque store, c. 1884-1900. Photo by William Henry Jackson.

Since its height in the late 19th and early 20th century, this area has degraded considerably. The stately mansions that line the sides of the Alameda and used to house the political and intellectual elite now sit among garbage, alcoholics and drug trafficking. There have been attempts to clean the area up and restore it, but there are disputes between residents and the borough of Miguel Hidalgo as to how to do this. Residents want the federal agency INAH to intervene to protect buildings such as the Justo Sierra House, now a primary school, and the Parish of La Candelaria, which is over 450 years old. The borough of Miguel Hidalgo has established a “consejo ciudadano” or citizen’s council to allow public participation in the “Renace” Project. The goals are to work on issues such as peddlers, shootings, pothole repair, crime and the maintenance of historic buildings.

== Landmarks ==
=== Alameda ===
The Alameda Tacubaya Park is located on Avenida Revolución, between Parque Lira and José María Vigil. When this neighborhood was at its height, the park was surrounded by mansions with large gardens, where the political and intellectual classes had country homes. In the center of the park is an obelisk honoring the Mártires de Tacubaya. Today the area is very much deteriorated, with the park inhabited by alcoholics and drug addicts, surrounded by garbage. Recently, the fountain that surrounded the obelisk was taken out and flat concrete put in its place. Other items that have been removed include ironwork benches with the Juarez eagle on them. The former pavement has been replaced with that of lesser quality.

=== Templo y Ex Convento de Santo Domingo (Parroquia de la Candelaria) ===
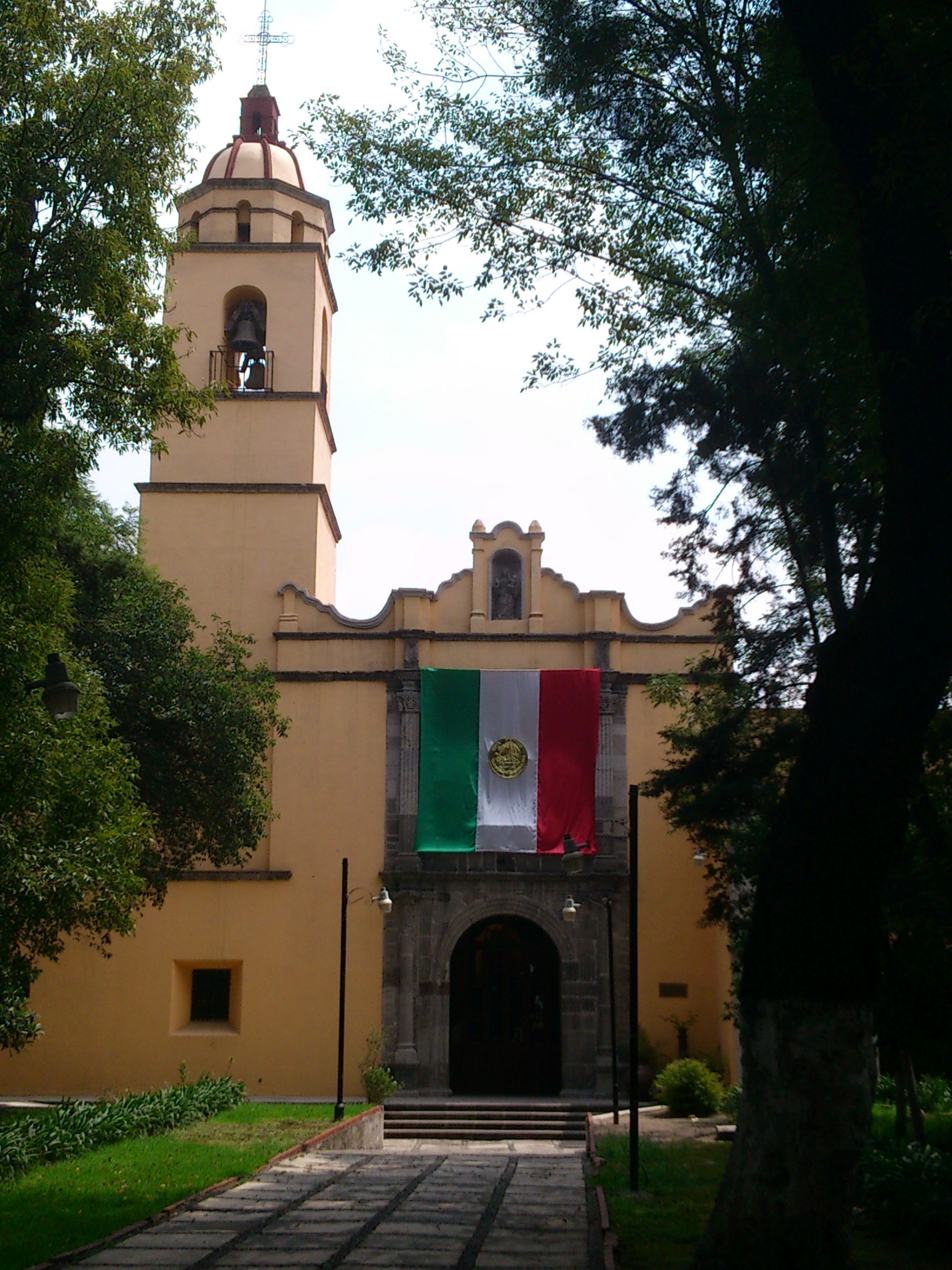
"La Candelaria" church

Located across Avenida Revolución from the Alameda. This is the only 16th century Dominican convent remaining in Mexico City. The date 1590 is inscribed into the walls, and in the arches the names of the peoples that helped in its construction are inscribed: Tlacateco, Huitzilan, Nonohualco and Tezcacuac. The church was dedicated to Nuestra Señora de la Purificación, advocate of the Virgin Mary, and in the annual festival dedicated to her many candles were lit; the festival thus became known as the Candelaria, and the church is also better known as la Parroquia de la Candelaria.

=== Museums and historic mansions ===
- The Casa de la Bola Museum is located on Parque Lira. This house is situated on what was the Villa de San Juan Tacubaya owned by Dr. Francisco Bazán Albornoz in 1916, who was an Inquisitor. Later the house had various owners including Archbishop Mateo Saga de Buquiero, Sebastián Guzmán y Córdova and Antonio de Osorio. According to oral tradition, this house also hosted Güera Rodríguez, Marquesa Calderón de la Barca and José Zorrilla as guests. Today the museum is administrated by the Antonio Haghenbeck y de la Lama Cultural Foundation, named after the last private owner of the house.
- Los Pinos, the official residence of the president of Mexico, is located on Parque Lira and Calzada Molino del Rey. Originally, it was the Hormiga Ranch, which was established at the end of the 17th century by the De la Torre family.
- National Meteorological Observatory is located on Avenida Observatorio. The building was offices of the archbishop and viceroy Antonio de Visarón y Eguiarreta built on lands he owned here. This house and land has seen visitors such as kings and presidents as well as invading armies. In the 20th century, the building was converted into the Museum of Astronomy, Geography and Meteorology. Today, it houses installations of the national weather service.
- The Cartography Museum is located on Avenida Observatorio in what used to be the monastery of San Diego. It was built and occupied by the Dieguino sect of the Franciscans, with funds donated by Mateo Mauleón. In 1847, this monastery was occupied by American troops under General Winfield Scott. One year later, liberal forces invaded and sacked the hospital. During the Cristero War, the monastery closed its doors due to the violence. The building was not reopened until the founding of the museum.

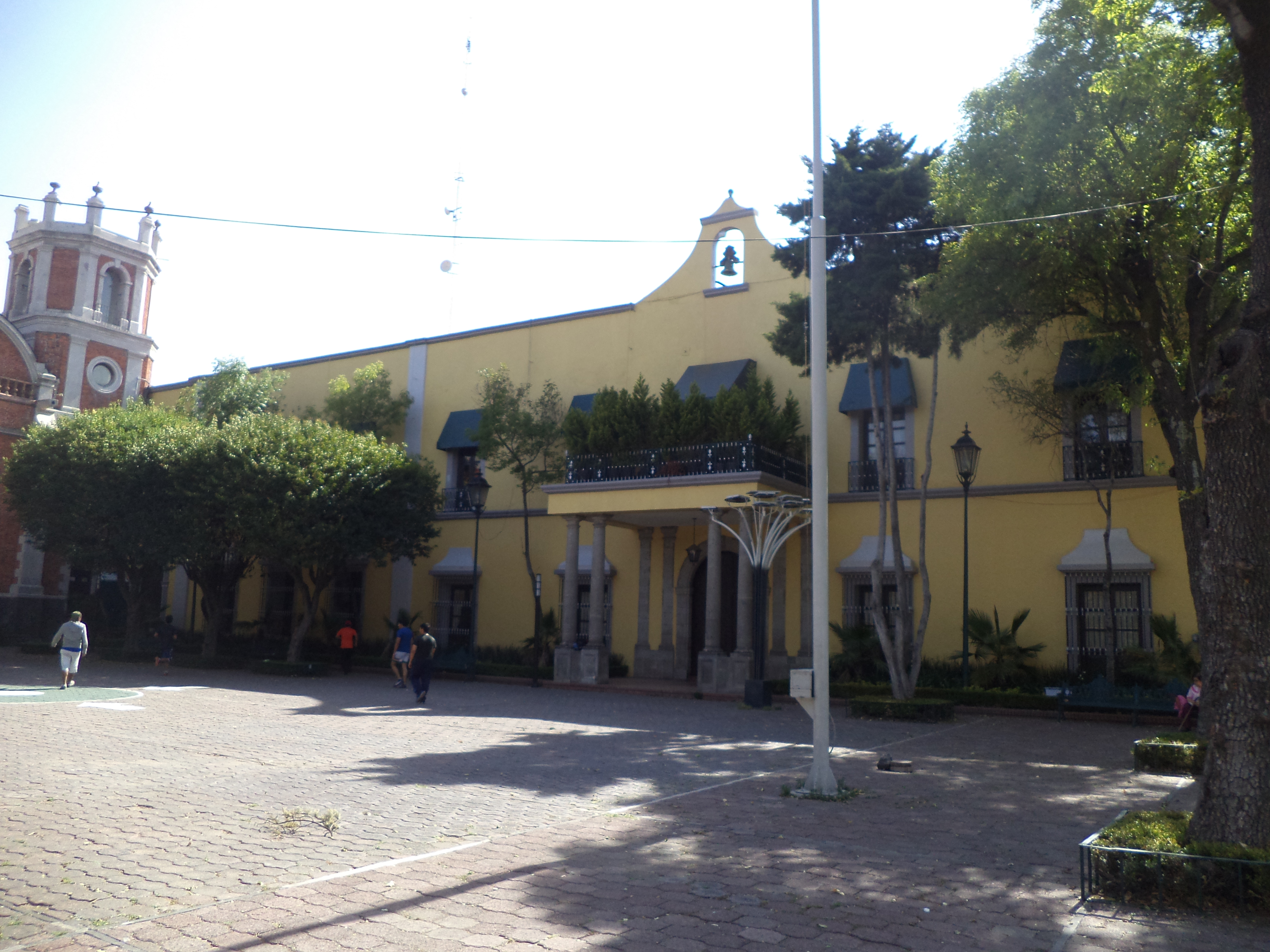
Casa Amarilla

- The Casa Amarilla (1618), at the north side of Parque Lira, originally was founded as a religious inn, now houses the borough offices of Miguel Hidalgo borough.

=== Luis Barragán House and Studio ===
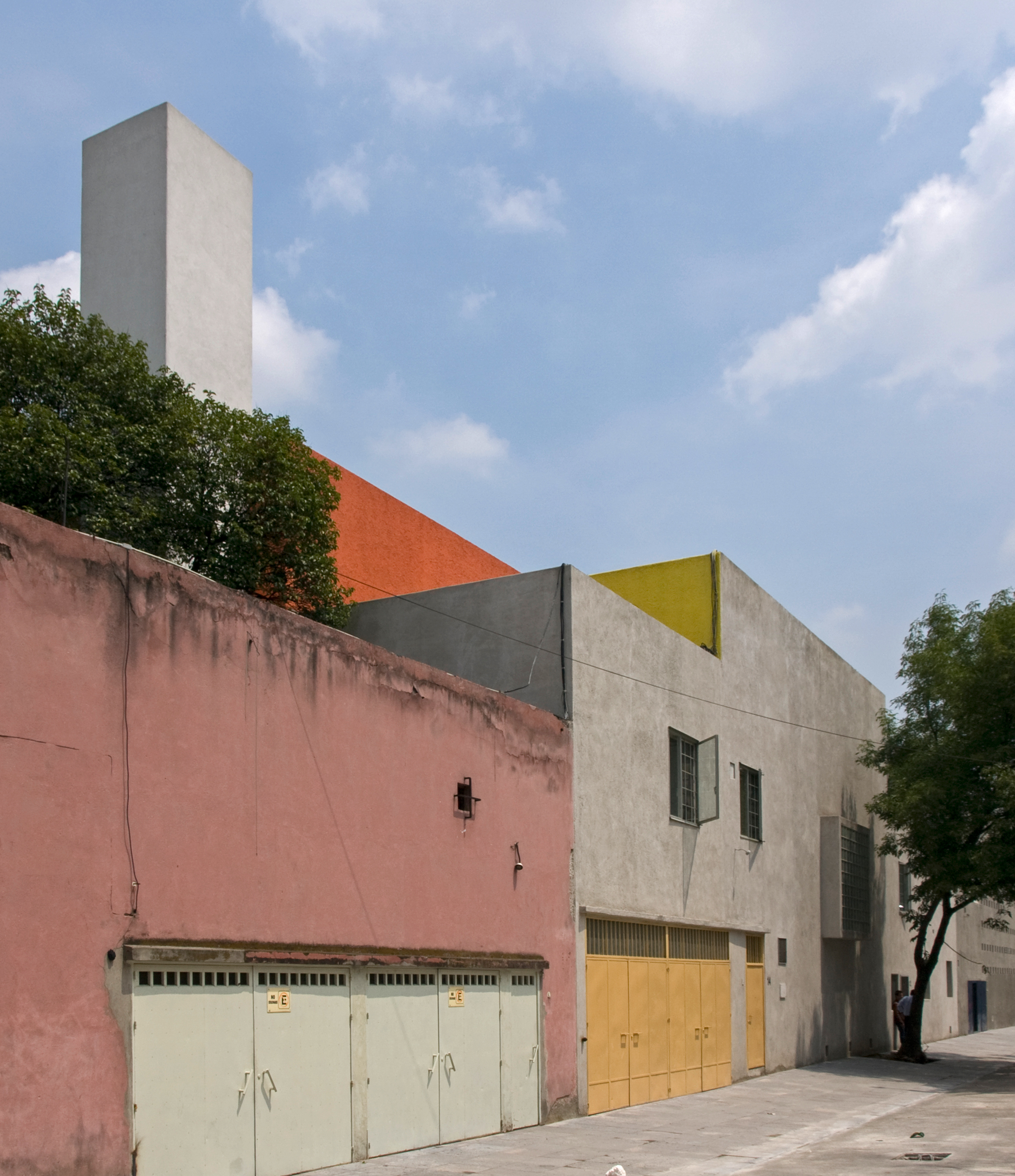
The exterior of the Luis Barragán House

The Luis Barragán House and Studio is located on General Francisco Ramirez street. Barragán was a major figure in Mexican culture, whose works have served to influence architects to the present day. His designs feature vibrant colors, fluid sequences of space and subdued lighting, and are based on traditional Mexican designs. His work earned him the 1980 Pritzker Prize, the most important in the field of architecture. His best-known works include The chapel of the Convent de las Capuchinas, his residence in Tacubaya and Torres de Satélite. The house was opened to the public in 1994 and remains as Barragan left it when he died in 1988. It is one of the modern architectural works that was recognized as a World Heritage Site in 2004. Visits are by appointment only and cost 100 pesos. He built the house to be simple on the outside and blend in with the rest of the neighborhood. Inside is where the creativity is located, with the arrangement of space, lighting and the integration of nature with the interior. The house in Tacubaya stands out in part due to its use of wood and stone, roofs held up with large beams and with tones of white, rose and yellow dominating. The windows focus on the interior garden. The Casa Amarilla (Yellow House) on Avenide Parque Lira is now used as offices for the borough. Some indicate that the house was built in 1618 with the intention of making is a monastery and a rest home for Franciscan priests. Some state that the name comes from the Marquis de la Amarillas, Agustin de Ahumada y Villalon who supposedly lived here at one time. Others state simply that it is due to the house traditionally being painted yellow. During the Reform Laws, the property was secularized and became government property. It was later owned by a number of wealthy families, before passing back into the hands of the government, which made it a juvenile detention facility. In 1979, the house was restored to its original architectural design to house offices of the Borough of Miguel Hidalgo. Next to the Casa Amarilla was built a chapel dedicated to the Virgin of Guadalupe. It was closed in 1926 and then converted first into storage and then into an orphanage. In the early 1990s, it was converted into a public library called the Carlos Chávez General Library with a collection of over 28,000 volumes.

=== Ermita building ===
The Ermita Building is considered an important example of Art Deco architecture and was the first high rise to be constructed in the Mexico City area. Its main facade is truncated on one corner and is topped by a series of horizontal plaques. The side facades also have plaques on the face, balconies and pilasters decorated in metal which define the movie theater area. Access to the commercial area is formed by an Art Deco arch. The building was criticized as a “concrete ax” in the 1920s after it was built. The construction of this building was partially aimed at the revitalization of the area in the 1930s. This building was to serve as a catalyst for change and for modernization. The building is eight floors high. However, this height caused opposition and an adjoining building, the Isabel Conjunto, was scaled back to four floors. Both were innovative at the time because they mixed different uses in the same building, commercial centers on the ground floor and residences on the upper floors. The building is commonly called “Canada” due to the large lighted “Canada” (a chain of stores in Mexico) which has been here since the 1950s. The building is in disrepair, in part from the addition of advertising signs, such as those for Coca Cola, Camel and Sol, without adapting the building to their weight. These signs also hide the building’s characteristics. The building has had no major restoration work done on it since it was inaugurated in 1931 and few consider it worth saving despite its historic importance.

=== The lost city ===
La Ciudad Perdida (The Lost City) of Tacubaya are small shacks made of cardboard, wood and other found items that line the narrow streets in a part of the neighborhood, on Becerra, Mártires de Tacubaya, Heroes de la Intervencion and 11 de Abril streets, surrounding a complete block. The neighborhood was always poor, first inhabited about 100 years ago when small houses of adobe with wood roofs were built, forming the narrow streets that are found here. The area is filled with garbage and the smell of urine and stagnant water from drains that no longer work. Drug use entered this area in the 1980s, first with marijuana, then with cocaine. Eventually, the area became a drug distribution center. Neighbors say that most of the people in the lost city are transvestites, drug addicts, thieves as well as entire families, of which there are an estimated hundred. Residents of both the shacks and the permanent buildings say that they have been promised solutions to their problems, but nothing is done.

== Parks ==
Parque Lira is a public park which is located on the 18th century estate of Vicente Lira. It is entered by a monumental archway.

== Hospitals ==
Hospital Pediatrico Tacubaya (Tacubaya Pediatric Hospital) specializes in the treatment of burn victims, treating about 680 children with severe burns each year. The cost of caring for these patients is between 25,00 and 30,000 pesos per day, with the average patients hospitalized for two weeks.

== Public transportation ==
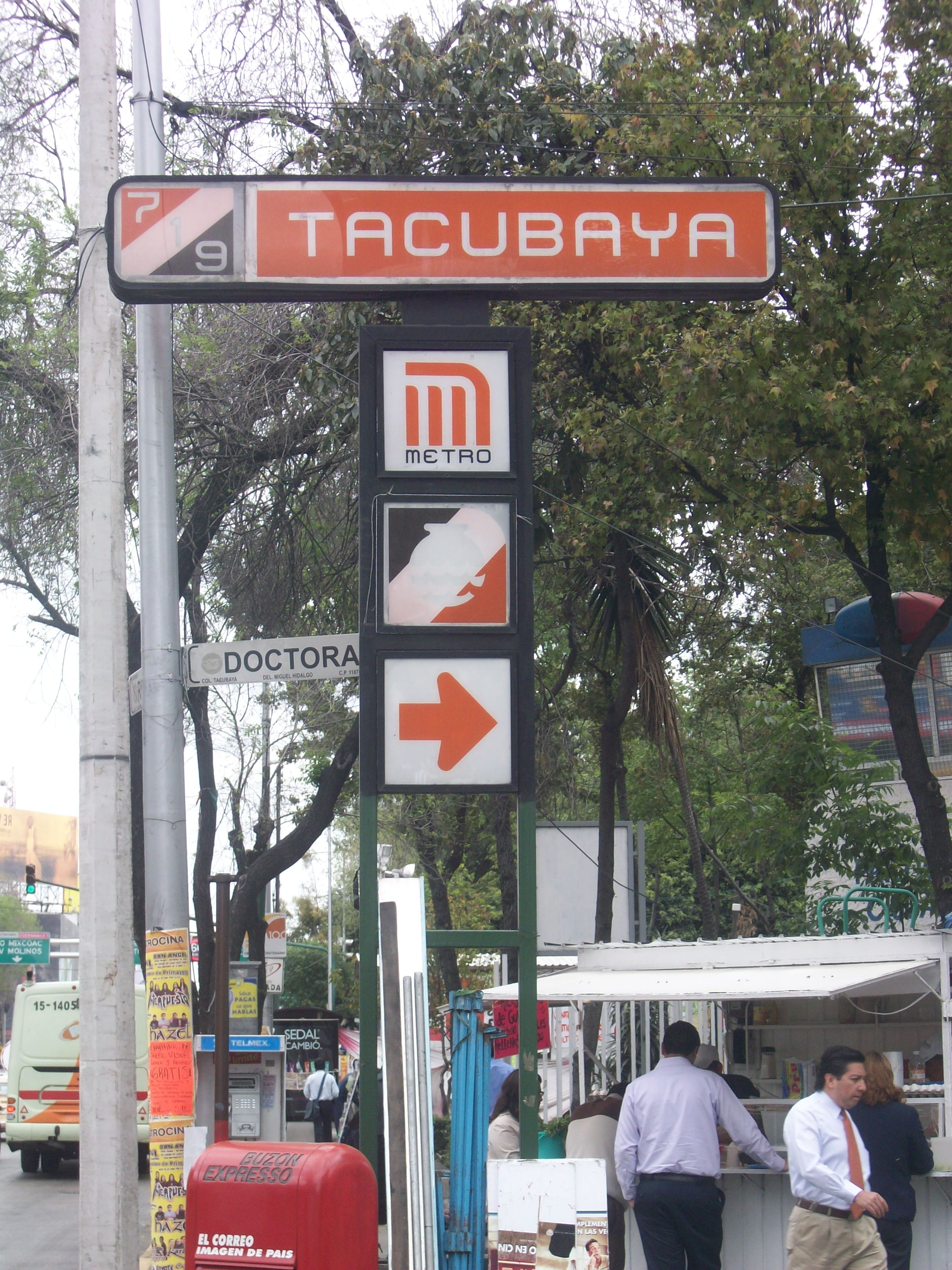
Tacubaya Metro Station

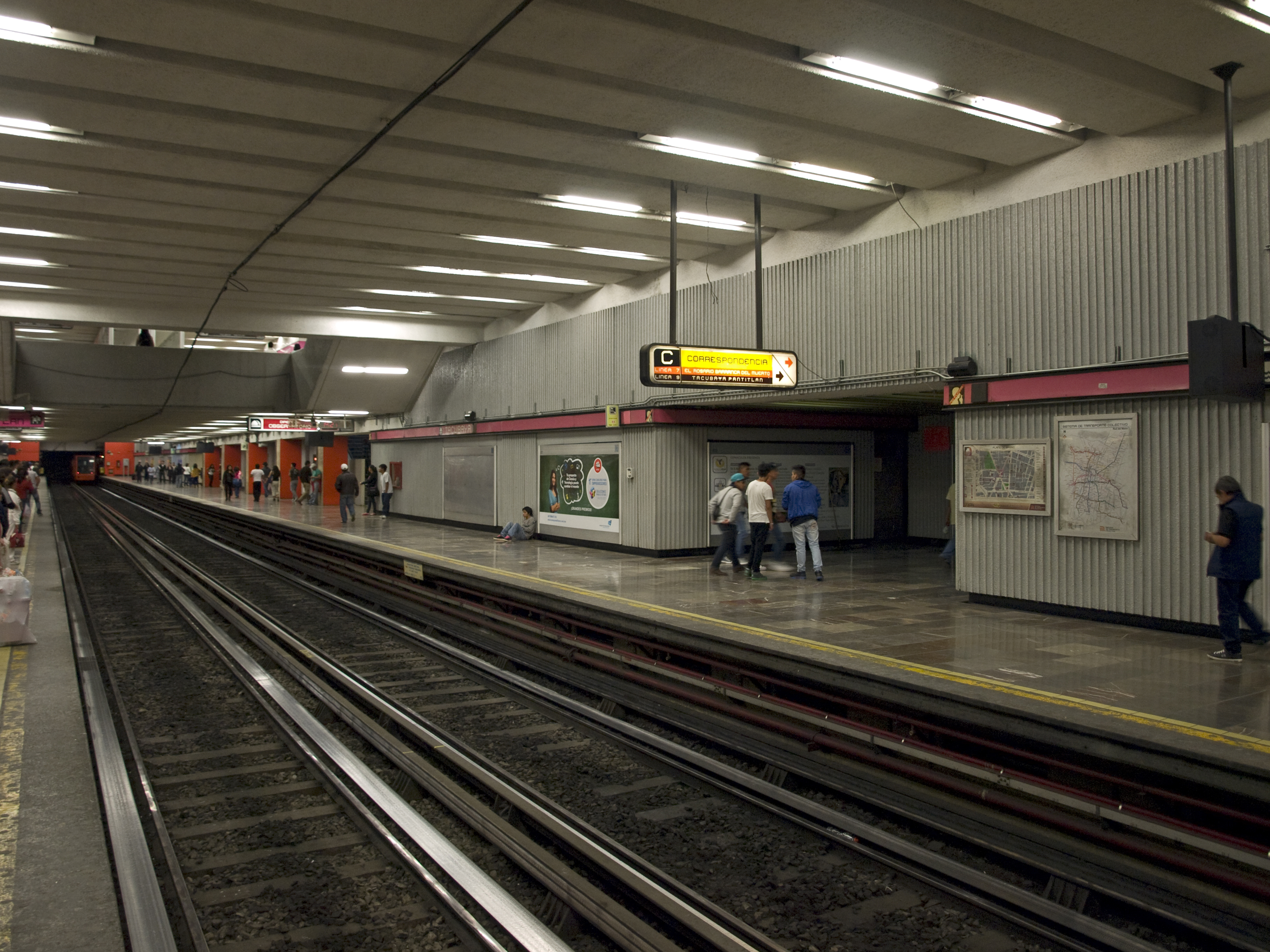
Metro line 1 platforms

Tacubaya is served by the metro station Tacubaya and by metrobus.

The best-known area of Tacubaya is a stretch of Avenida Jalisco. Lines 1, 7 and 9 of the Metro, as well as the end of Line 2 of the Metrobus and numerous busses intersect at what the government called the Centro de Transferencia Modal, located along Avenida Jalisco between Carlos Lazo and Tordo streets. (Cetram) Over 200 mostly small (micro) busses converge here from twelve different routes. Each day 20,000 private cars pass through area around Avenida Jalisco as well, with a total of about 850,000 vehicles. In October 2009, the government worked to remove the nearly 1,000 peddlers who set up stands here, blocking sidewalks and streets. However, neighbors say this is impossible to do permanently since the peddlers need to earn money. Even without the vendors the traffic situation is chaotic with busses lining up on the street waiting for passengers and blocking lanes and intersections and with piles of garbage on the streets. Buses and taxis park and stop illegally in prohibited areas because there are too many for the police to control. There are 18 lanes total on the main roads here (Revolución, Viaducto, Benjamin Franklin and Parque Lira streets) but generally 13 of them are blocked by buses and other public transport.

== Notable people ==
- Manuel de la Peña y Peña, president of Mexico from September 16 to November 13 1847 and then again from January 8 to June 3 1848
