= Francesco Saverio Cavallari =

Sicilian architect and painter

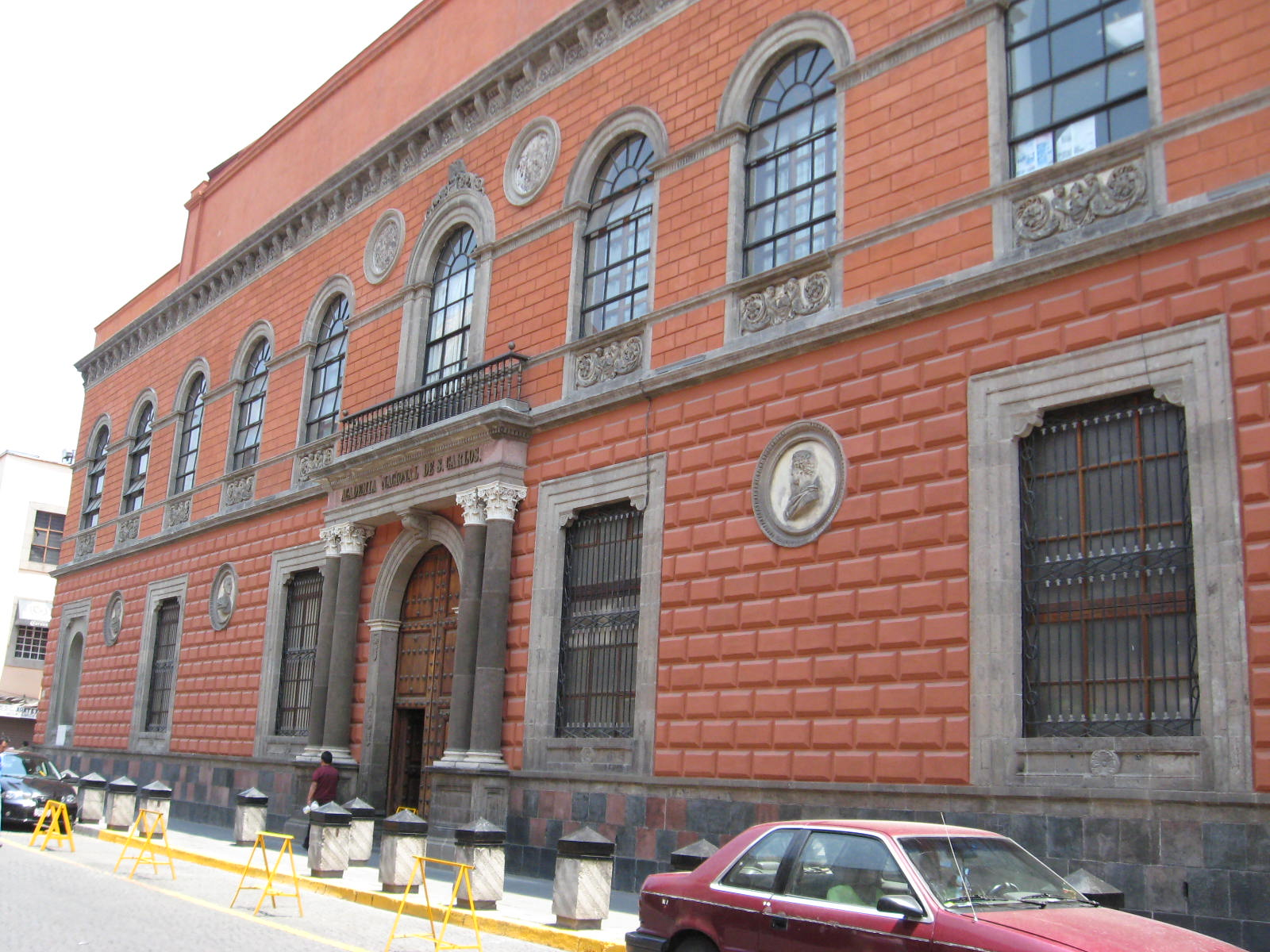
Façade of the Academia de San Carlos

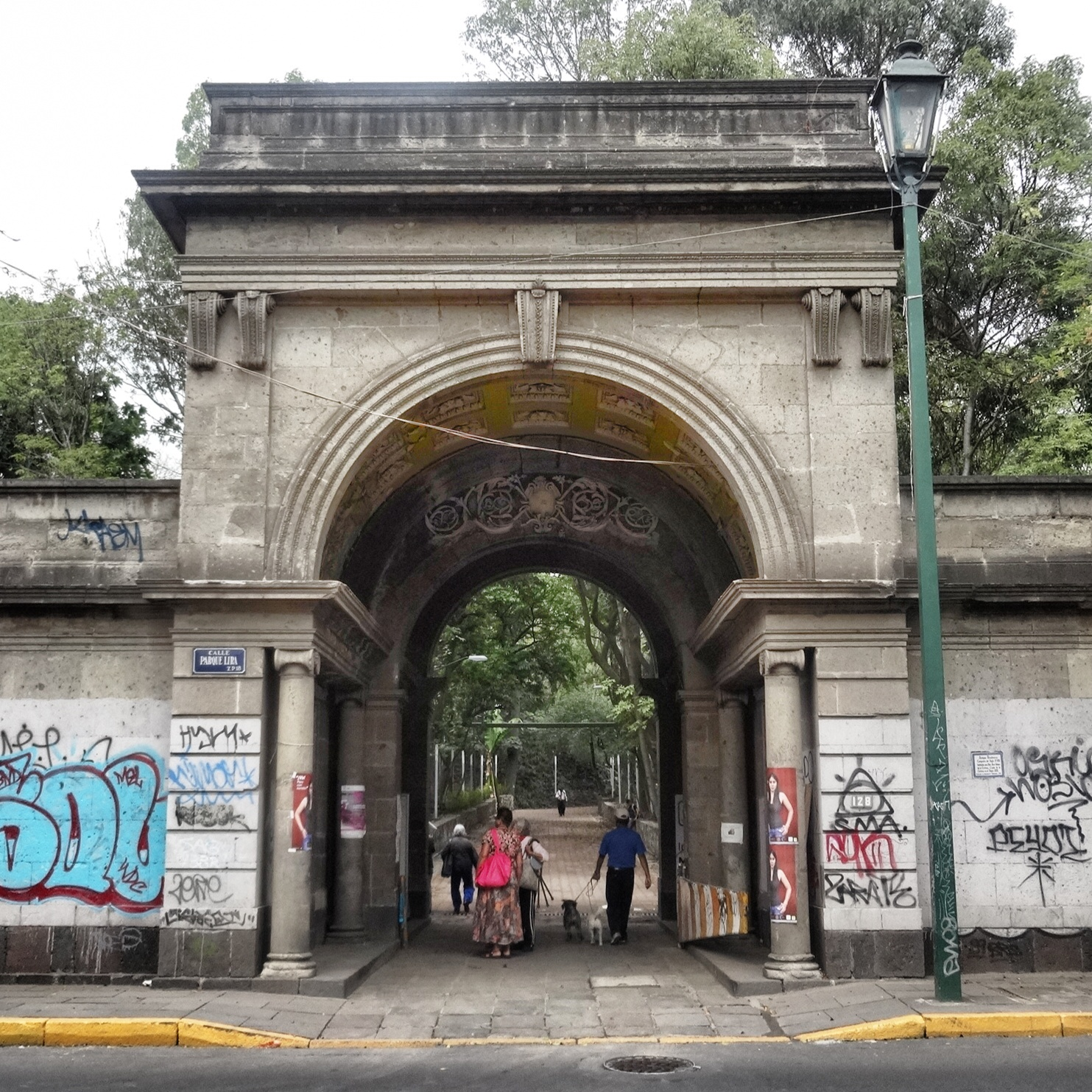
Parque Lira - Entrance arch

Francesco Saverio Cavallari (1809 or 2 March 1810–1896), also known in Mexico as Javier Cavallari, was an architect, professor, painter and archeologist. He was active in Mexico City between 1857 and 1864.

Cavallari was born in Palermo, Sicily, but obtained a degree from the University of Göttingen. He became an art professor at the University of Palermo, then at the Accademia di Belle Arti of Milan before becoming director of the Academia de San Carlos in Mexico City. He designed its present façade. He also designed the entrance arch at Parque Lira park.

He received membership in many archaeological and architectural societies across Europe.
