= La Sabatina =

Church in Mexico City

Coordinates: 19.4157°N 99.1805°W

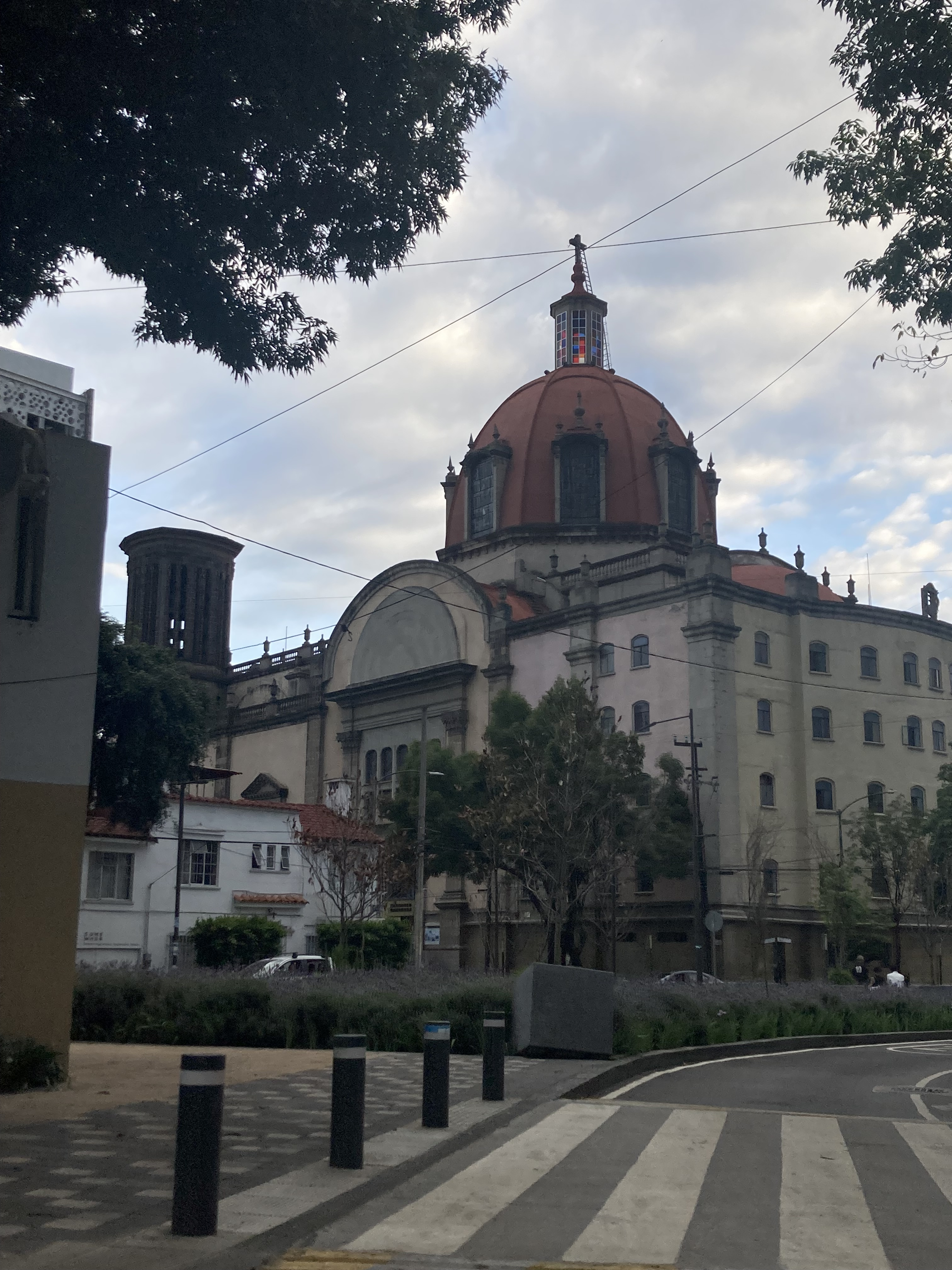
La Sabatina church in San Miguel Chapultepec, Mexico City

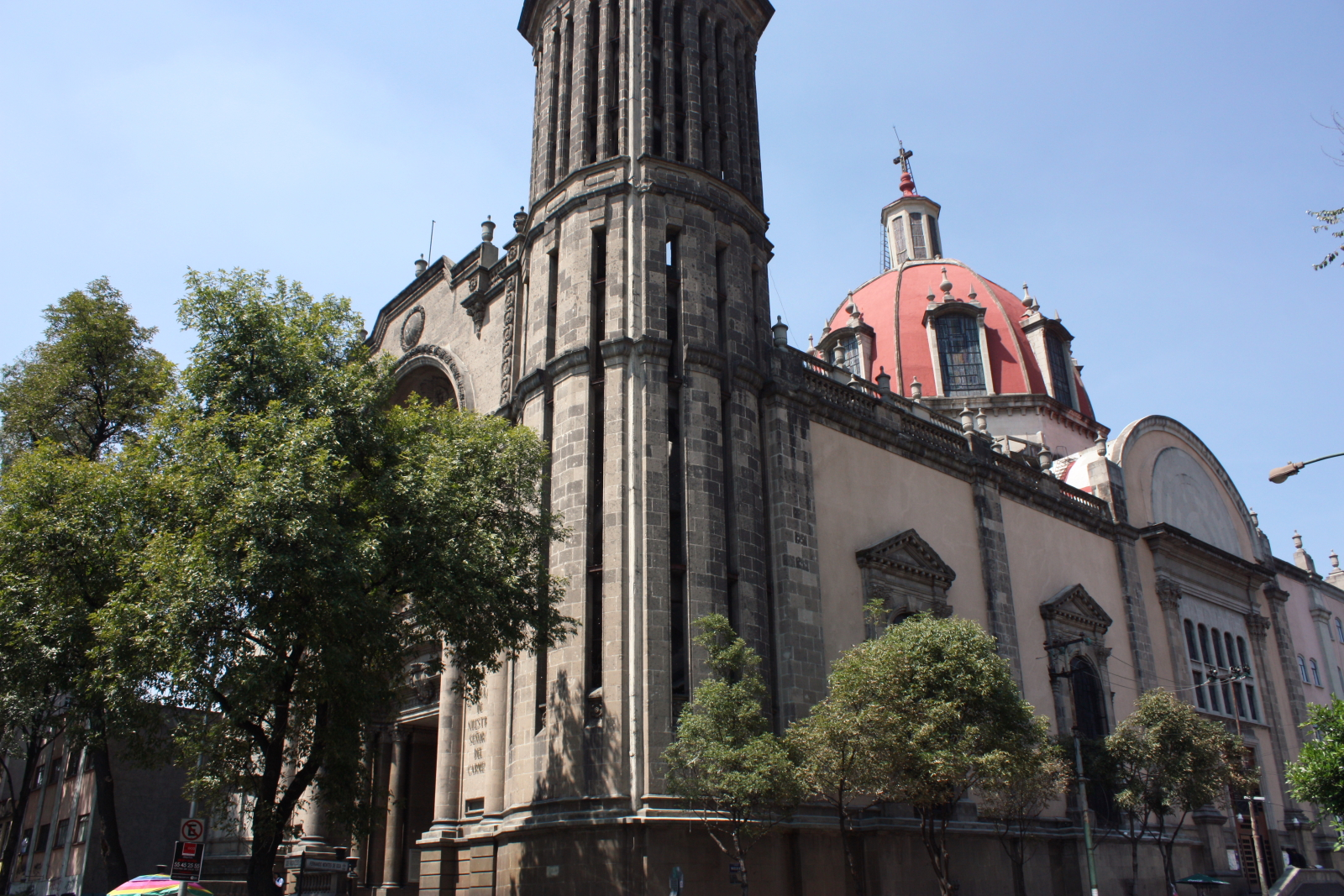
Santuario Parroquial de Nuestra Señora del Carmen "La Sabatina"

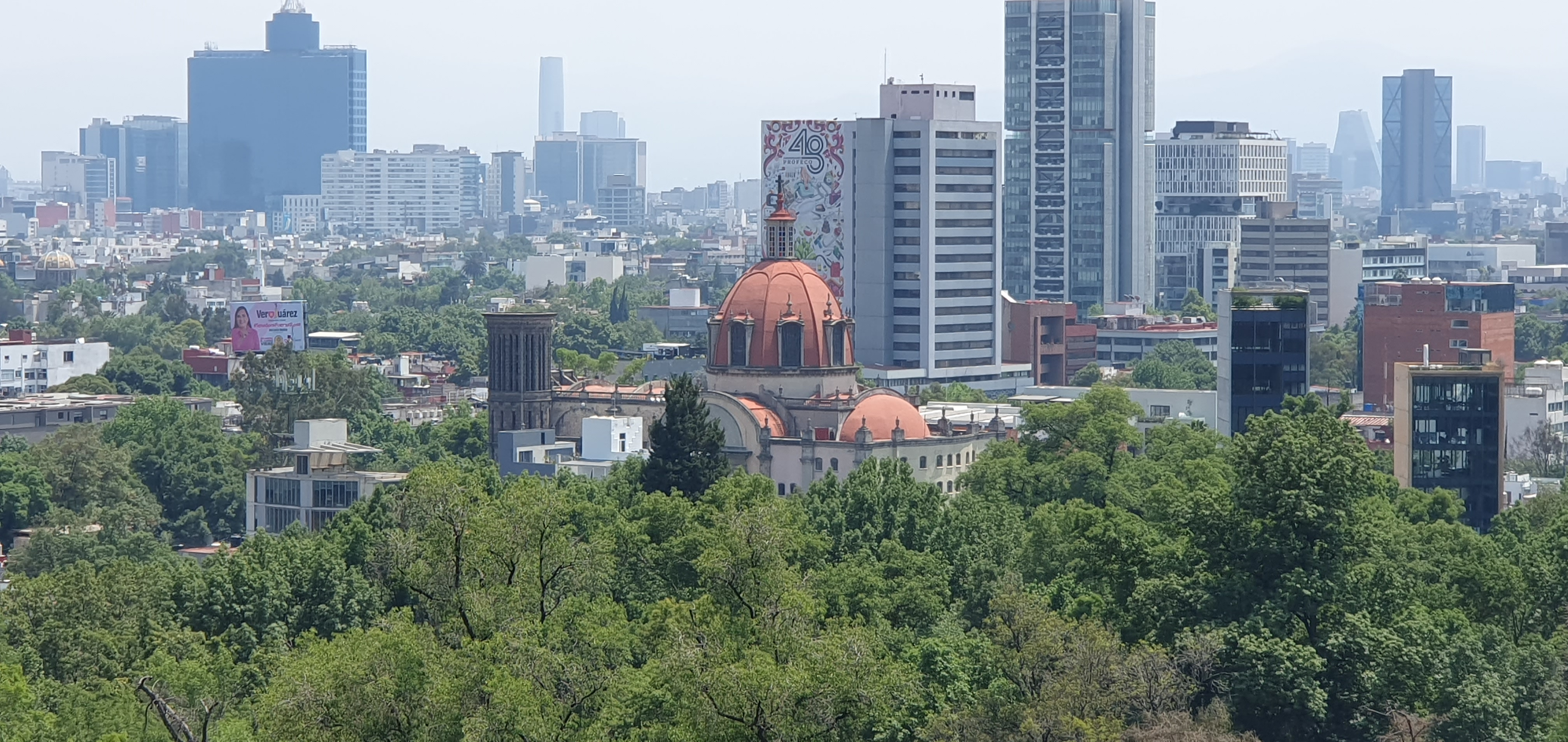
La Sabatina is located in San Miguel Chapultepec

Santuario Parroquial de Nuestra Señora del Carmen "La Sabatina" is a church located in San Miguel Chapultepec, Mexico City. The first stone was laid in 1910, and the church was consecrated in 1912.
