= San Miguel Chapultepec =

Coordinates: 19.411473°N 99.188521°W

- Neighborhood
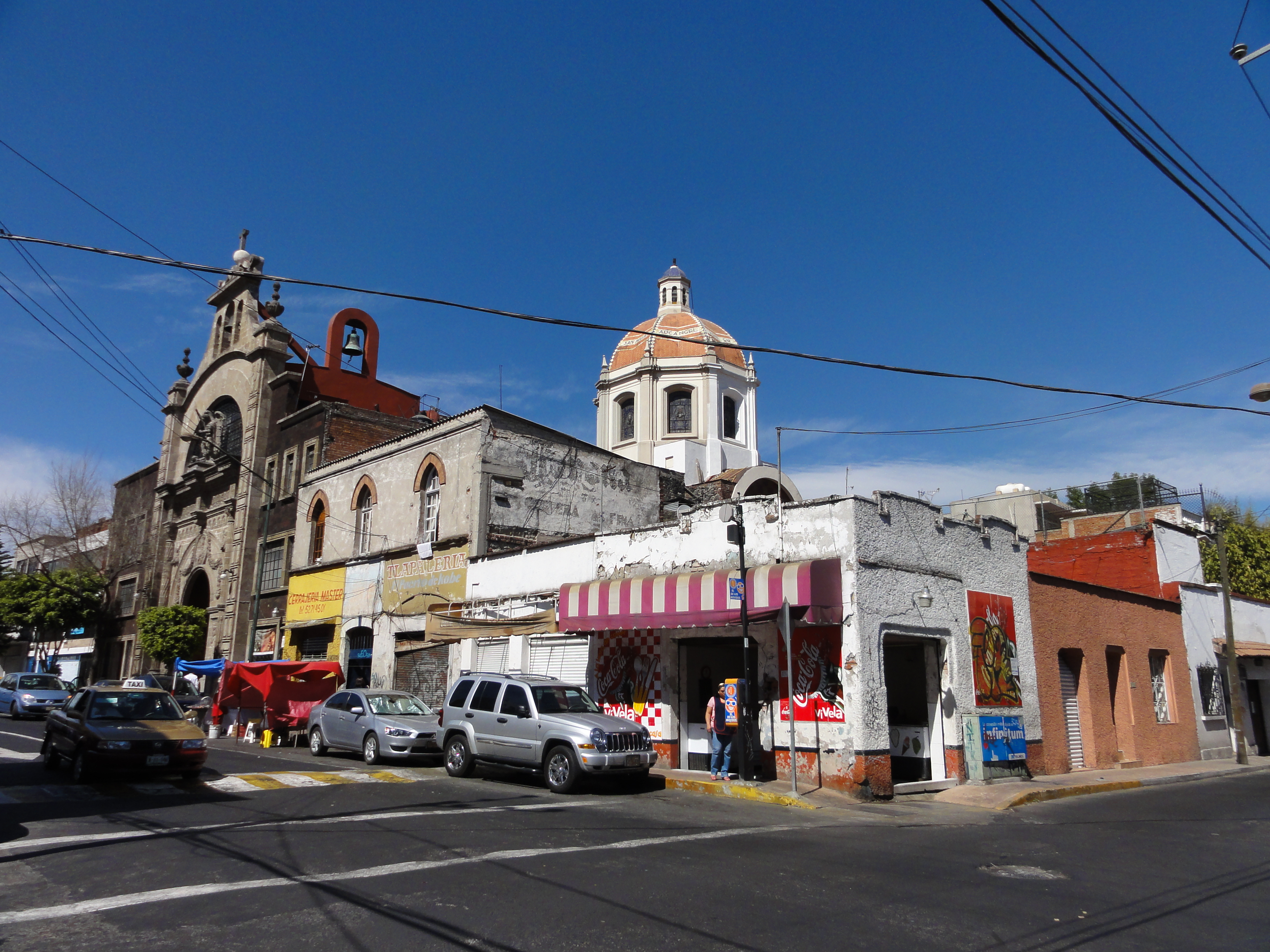
- Parroquia de San Miguel Arcángel
- Interactive map of San Miguel Chapultepec
- Country: Mexico
- City: Mexico City
- Borough: Miguel Hidalgo

Population
  - Total: 26,715
- Postal code: 11850

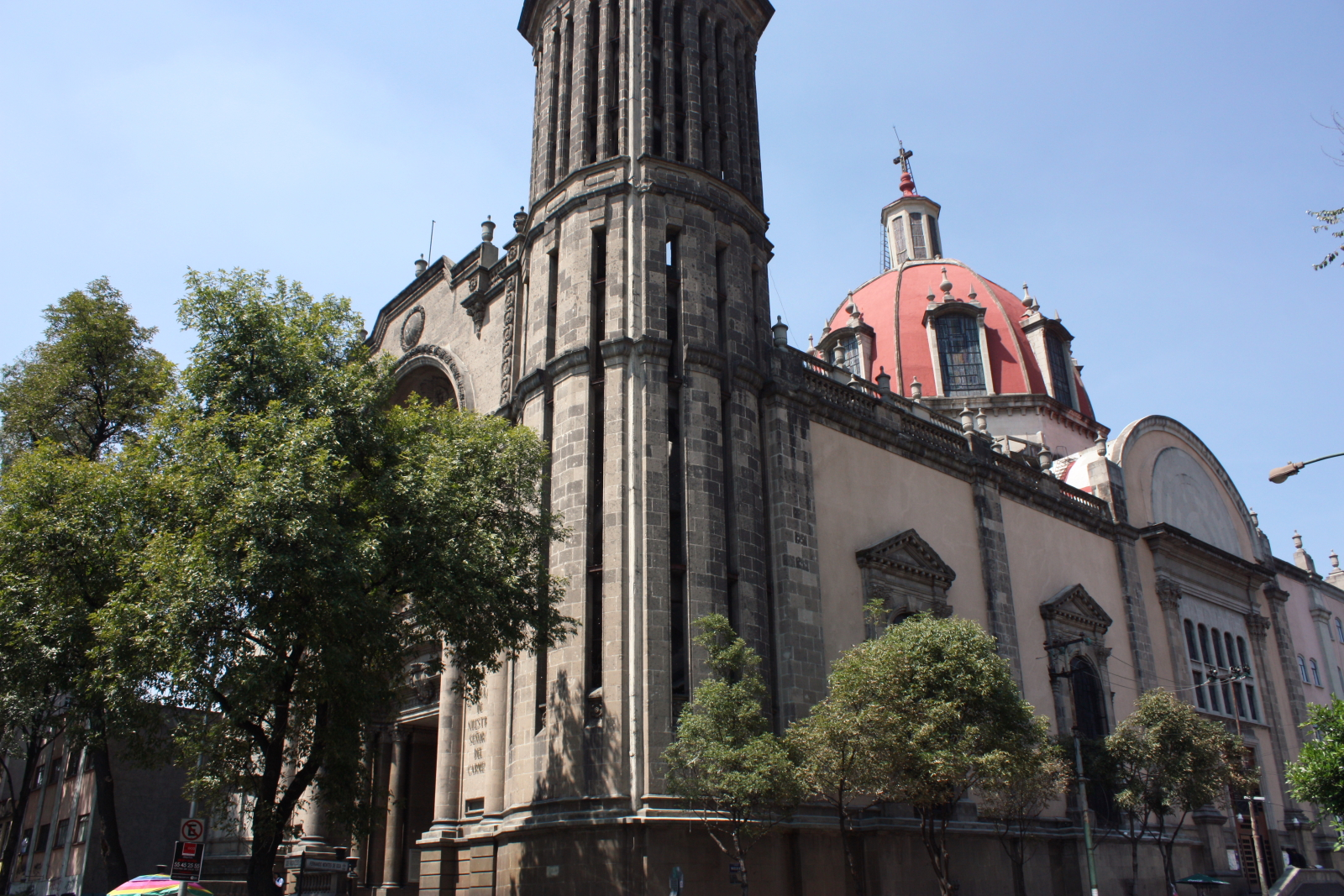
Santuario Parroquial de Nuestra Señora del Carmen "La Sabatina"

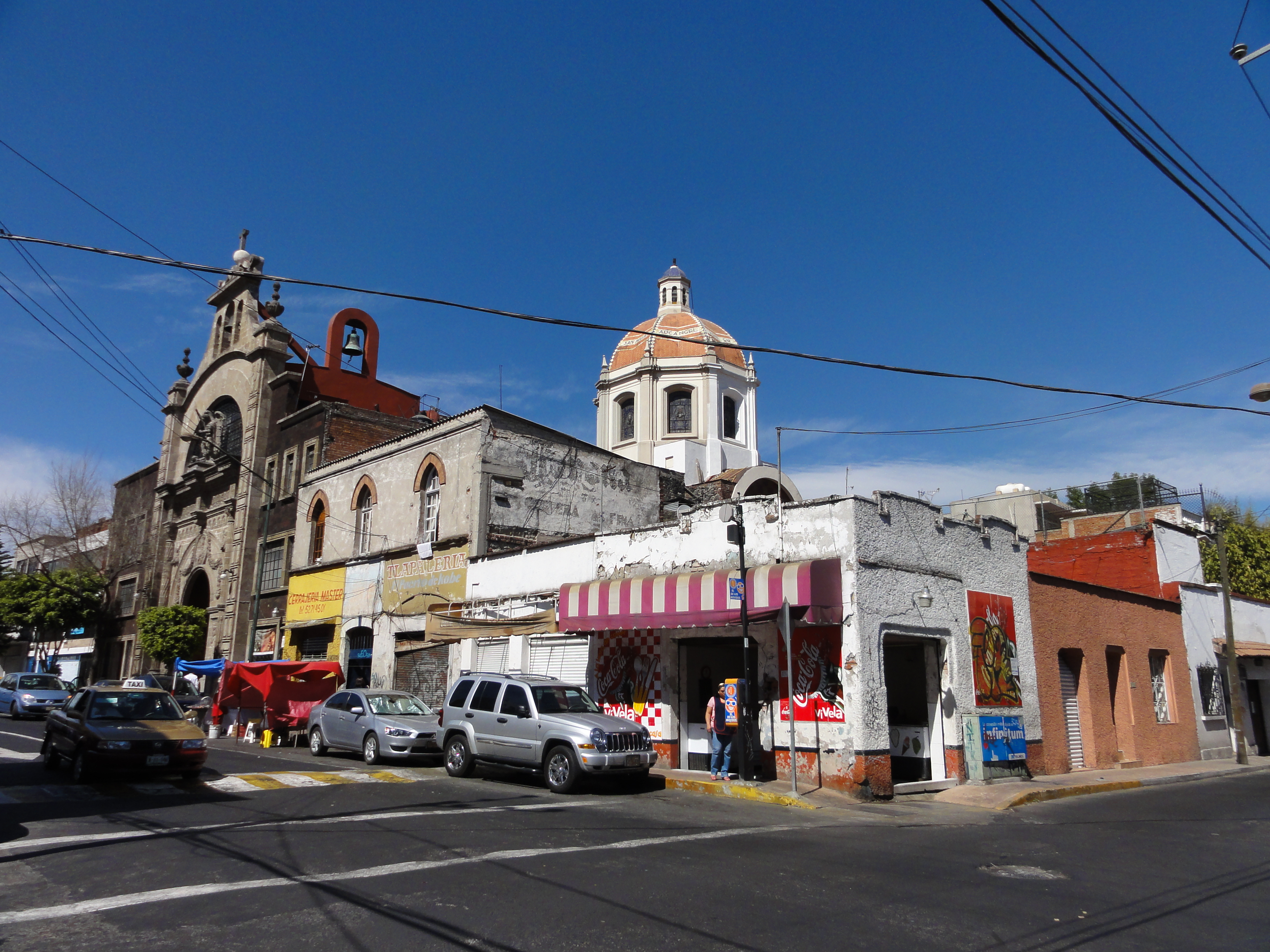
Parroquía de San Miguel Arcángel

San Miguel Chapultepec is a colonia or neighborhood in Delegación Miguel Hidalgo in Mexico City.

Its borders are:

- Avenida Constituyentes and Avenida Chapultepec on the west, bordering Chapultepec Park
- The Circuito Interior José Vasconcelos and Ave. Jalisco on the southeast, bordering the Condesa district (colonias Condesa and Hipódromo Condesa) and colonia Tacubaya
- Parque Lira on the southwest, bordering colonias Ampliación Daniel Garza, Observatorio and Tacubaya

The colonia's streets carry the names of generals and governors of Mexico. The buildings mostly consist of houses, whether still used as residences or converted into offices. Being a central neighborhood where the Circuito Interior freeway, Ave. Constituyentes (a main through road to Santa Fe, Toluca and points west), and the ejes viales 2 and 4 South, the area is saturated with traffic.

== Demographics ==
INEGI reported 7,605 area inhabitants in 2005.

== Religious buildings ==
- Parroquía de San Miguel Arcángel
- Santuario Parroquial de Nuestra Señora del Carmen "La Sabatina".

== Hospital ==
The Mocel hospital of the Grupo Ángeles is located here.

== Public transportation ==
Metro stations on the neighborhood's border are Chapultepec, Juanacatlán, Constituyentes and Tacubaya. Some stations are closed for remodeling.

Mexico City Metrobús Line 2 serves Eje 4 Sur until Tacubaya with stops at De La Salle, Parque Lira, Tacubaya and Antonio Maceo (corner of Jalisco).

In the neighborhood there are EcoBici bikeshare bikes.
