= Parque Lira =

Park in Mexico City

Coordinates: 19°24′19″N 99°11′24″W

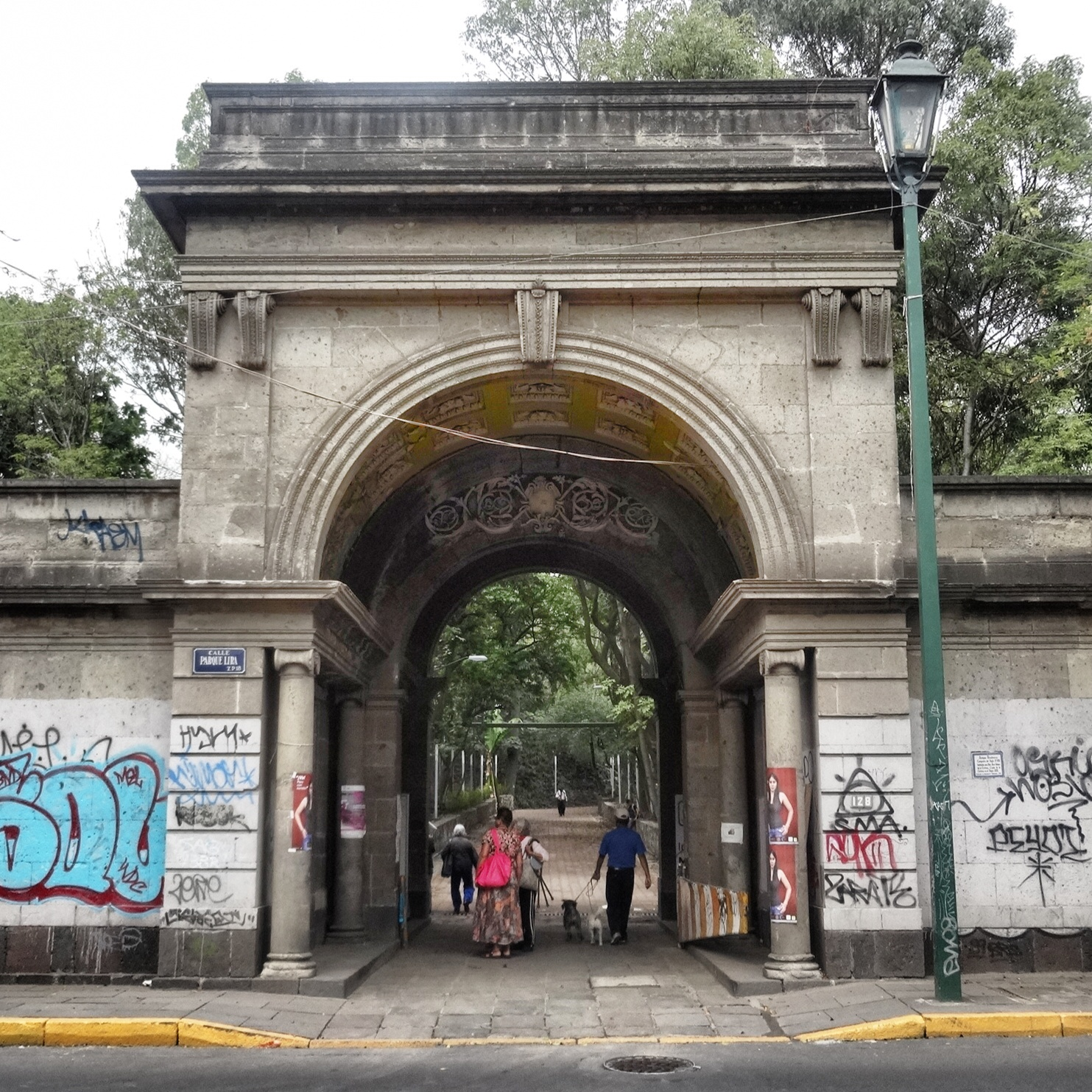
- Entrance Arch (Francesco Saverio Cavallari, architect)
- Location in Mexico City
- Location: Tacubaya, Mexico City

Parque Lira is a public park in the working class Tacubaya district of Mexico City. It is located on the 18th century estate of Vicente Lira in an area that originally was a separate town. Its monumental archway was designed by Italian architect Francesco Saverio Cavallari, who was active in Mexico 1857–1864.

The land was part of what was once a vast estate, including the Casa de la Bola (now a cultural center), that once belonged to Mariana Gomez de la Cortina, the second Countess of Cortina. After her death on January 6, 1846, the land was subdivided, and part became property of the Lira Mora family, textile moguls, during the first part of the twentieth century. The gardens were adorned with a palace, bridges, water mirrors, a pergola and bronze fountains as well as a neoclassical grand archway at the entrance. During the Lázaro Cárdenas del Río government, the land was expropriated and an asylum was established here for children with mental illnesses; it operated until the offices of the Miguel Hidalgo borough were established adjacent to what is now the park.

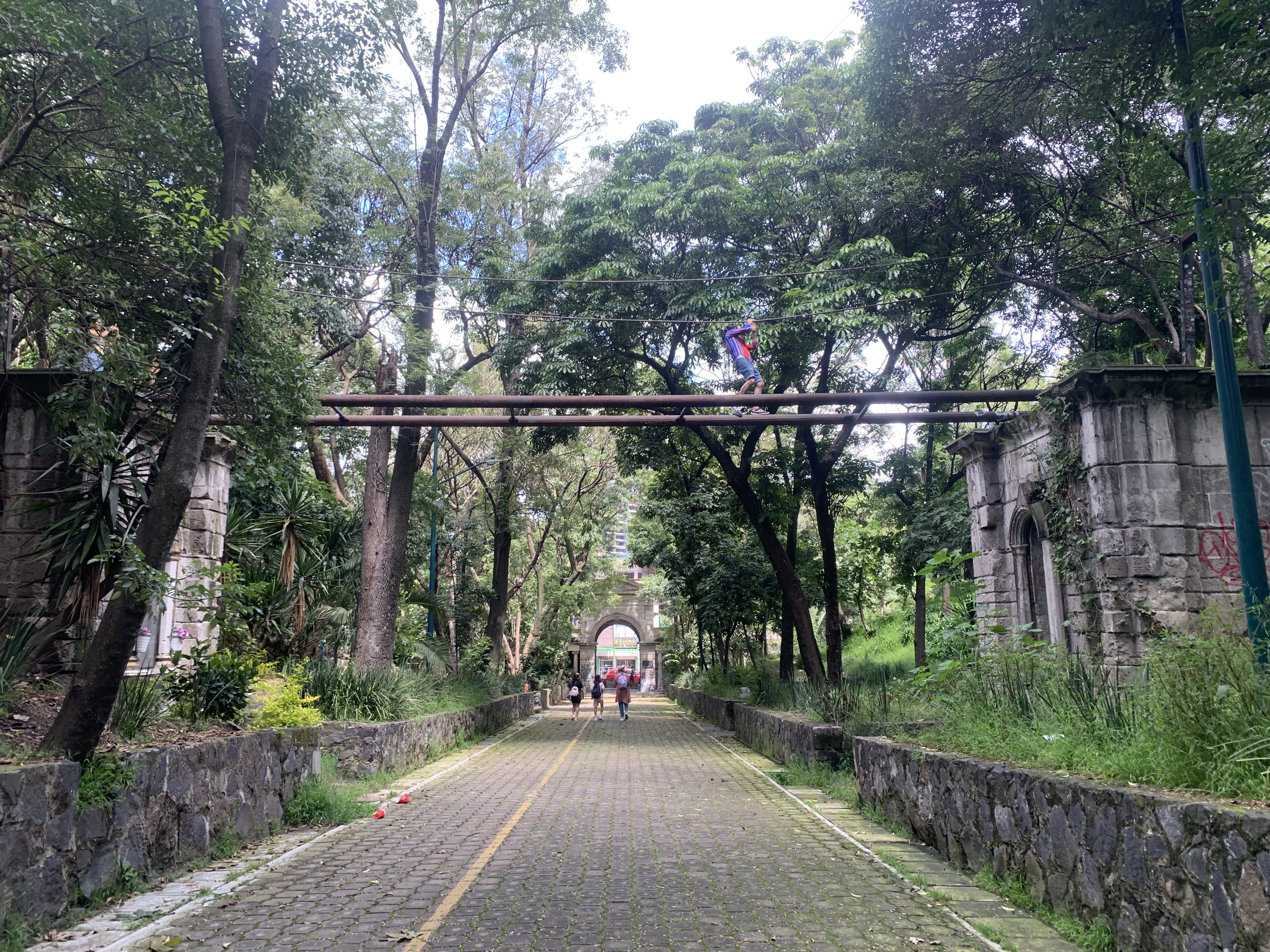
Main path of Parque Lira

The park is located on the eponymous avenue and near the Metrobús Parque Lira bus rapid transit stop.
