= Santiago Borja =

Mexican contemporary visual artist

Santiago Borja Charles
- Born: 1970 (age 55–56); Mexico City, Mexico
- Education: University of Paris 8 Vincennes-Saint-Denis, France
- Alma mater: Ibero-American University, Mexico
- Occupation: Visual Artist
- Website: https://www.santiagoborja.art/

Santiago Borja (born 1970, Mexico) is a Mexican visual artist.

== History ==
Borja studied Architecture at the Ibero-American University in Mexico City and graduated in Theory and Practice of Contemporary Arts and New Media at the University of Paris 8 Vincennes-Saint-Denis in France. As an artist, he works on the intersection of art, anthropology and architecture, creating large-scale installations and architectural interventions that intend to blur cultural boundaries and contrast traditional crafts with contemporary theory and design.

== Selected works ==
=== Divan / Free Floating Attention Piece, 2010 ===
In 2010, Borja worked in Sigmund Freud’s London house. During the exhibition, he covered the Persian carpet of the famous sofa with fabric and cushions woven by Wixarika women. Through this symbolic gesture, he discussed the universality of Freudian analysis grids to highlight other imaginaries and representation systems. This does not aim to the confrontation of cultures, but rather the suggestion of new relationships between them. The divan, a monument of “Western thought”, is thus metaphorically treated like a palimpsest, rich in the multiple layers of texts within.

=== Fort Da / Sampler, 2010 ===
In 2010, Borja worked on the roof of the Neutra VDL Studio and Residences (Neutra VDL Research House II), a Californian villa built in Los Angeles by the architect Richard Neutra in 1965. By literally transforming the modernist architecture into a loom, Borja used the beams of the pergola on the terrace as a structure for suspending a large textile piece. The in situ installation was made by two women weavers from Chiapas, in Southern Mexico, using traditional backstrap weaving technique. The geometric patterns they used are associated with time-honoured beliefs. Here, the lozenge and its four corners represent the cosmos' cardinal points. Connecting the individual with the world was also one aspect of Richard Neutra’s project when he built the VDL House. Through the installation, Borja associated two gestures in one and the same space/time-frame: modernist American architecture and Mayan textile art.

=== Sitio, 2011 ===
In 2011, Borja worked in the Le Corbusier’s Villa Savoye, illustrative of the modernist “International Style”, exploring the bonds between modern architecture and its surviving features of primitivism. He installed in the Villa’s grounds an overlay of the two palapas, one of which is upside down. He juggles with the formal links between the piles of the Villa Savoye and the structure of the palapa, traditional Maya dwellings made with wood and palm fronds, as well as with primitive Swiss lakeside dwellings, of which Le Corbusier seemed to have retained unwitting trace.

=== Jung-Catcher, 2013 ===
In 2013, Borja developed an installation project intermingling Modern thought, through a diagram by Jung illustrating his analytical psychology theory, and a magical counterpart, through a pre-Columbian dream-catcher. Structured by the interwoven tracery of these two references, the work syncretizes a form of modern medicine and another form of ancestral care, both oriented towards the fragility of the soul.

=== Suprasensible, 2015 ===
In 2015, Borja worked in the emblematic Mies van der Rohe Barcelona Pavilion. Concerned with astral and invisible bodies, he re-read architecture from an anthropological angle, suggesting a re-instatement of that generative presence of the body in architecture through the work of a group of esoteric interpreters practicing Eurythmy: a bodily experience seeking a holistic approach to space through a series of coded movements where macrocosm and microcosm are intermingled. Borja’s work consists of a selection of videos, a textile piece, photos and sculptures, which thus juxtapose the visual arts and architecture, esotericism and geometric forms, abstraction and color.

=== Everything Falls in Place When It Collapses, 2016 ===
In 2016, Borja developed a site-specific project in response to the Casa Grande Ruins National Monument —a Southwest icon of Navajo culture over which a steel roof was constructed in the early 20th century— and its complex history within the national cultural politics of the United States over the past 125 years. His project was intended to raise questions about the different cultures —Native American, white, academic, artistic and administrative— related to archaeological remains, Modernist rationalism and the belief in its ability to solve problems through technological means, and the complexity of interpreting and preserving the material past, both ancient and Modern.

=== A Mental Image, 2016 ===
In 2016, Santiago Borja installed a temporary observatory based on theosophical principles on the rooftop of the Sonneveld House. The observatory, built with traditional roof thatching, was devoted to Helena Petrovna Blavatsky, co-founder of the Theosophical Society. Deriving from the Sonneveld House double condition as a case of Dutch Functionalism and as the work of theosophically inspired architects, the project highlights the conceptual ambiguities that fed Modernism. The form was conceived through the use of esoteric geometry, in particular Paul Schatz’s invertible cube design, and is understood as a meditation space to be activated by the house visitors.

=== Totemic Sampler, 2018 ===
In 2018, as an artist in residence at Atelier Calder, Borja worked on a project dealing with a fundamental theme in architectural theory: its origins. Wavering between shelters and textile wrapping, the installation consisted of a nomadic wooden structure covered with a large patchwork of “sarapes” of Mexican fabric mixed with modernist motifs developed by the Bauhaus weaving workshops in the early 20th century. In addition, the traditional motifs are above all a language, for the embroidery samplers handed down from generation to generation are a distinctive family “signature” which, like DNA code, links the individual to his/her social group (the clan). Forming a new language, this garment thus offers a pure geometric abstraction, detached from any totemic structure, and any social and cultural origin.

=== Cosmic Sampler, 2019 ===
In 2019, Borja developed a large-dimension architectural / textile structure, specifically for the Biennale d’Architecture d’Orléans. The shape and design is the result of the collaboration with Alejandro López, a Huichol mara'akame, representing the “conceptual route” of the Huichol traditional pilgrimage. This geometric structure creates a three-dimensional platform, which can be used for sitting or lying down.

== Exhibitions ==
Important solo exhibitions include "Réplica" which collects a selection of the artist's work on issues such as architecture, heritage, and esotericism at Museo Amparo, Puebla, Mexico (2022): Santiago Borja’s mid-career retrospective Premier Contact at Le Quadrilatère, Beauvais, France (2021), A Mental Image at Huis Sonneveld, Rotterdam, Netherlands (2016), Suprasensible at Mies van der Rohe Barcelona Pavilion, Barcelona, Spain (2015), Sitio at Villa Savoye, Poissy, France (2011), and Divan/ Free-Floating Attention Piece at Freud Museum, London, UK (2010).

Borja has participated in group exhibitions such as Biennale d’architecture d’Orléans in Orléans, France (2019), California-Pacific Triennial at Orange County Museum of Art, California, US (2017), Weaving & We at Triennial of Fiber Art, Hangzhou, China (2016), Chicago Architecture Biennial in Chicago, US (2015), and The Global Contemporary at ZKM/ Museum of Contemporary Art, Karlsruhe, Germany (2011), among others.

== Collections ==
Santiago Borja's work is part of international art collections such as FRAC Pays de la Loire, Jumex Foundation, Contemporary Art University Museum, Graham Foundation, and Scottsdale Museum of Contemporary Art

== Selected Bibliography ==
- Altvater, Silke. “Santiago Borja - The Global Contemporary.” The Global Contemporary, 2011, www.global-contemporary.de/en/artists/90-santiago-borja.
- Borja, Santiago, et al. “Critique: Santiago Borja and the Modern Landmark.” Intervention, edited by Sarah Lorenzen and Bryony Roberts, Amsterdam, Netherlands, Amsterdam University Press, 2015, pp. 30–51.
- Coblentz, Cassandra, et al. “Santiago Borja.” 2017 California-Pacific Triennial: Building as Ever, New York City, Prestel, 2017, pp. 46–47.
- Damani, Abdelkader, and Luca Galofaro. “Remedies for Solitude.” Nos Années de Solitude. Biennale d’Architecture d’Orléans (French Edition), 2nd Edition, France, PRESSES DU REEL, 2019, pp. 43–85.
- Echezarrta, Pilar. “Arquitecturas Efímeras.” Arquine, no. 57, 2011, p.
- Fau, Alexandra. “Santiago Borja.” Revue Archistorm, Sept. 2007, p.
- Grima, Joseph, et al., editors. “Off-Site Projects.” The State of the Art of Architecture, Chicago, Chicago Architecture Biennial, 2015, pp. 122–31.
- Lozano, Catalina. “Tensiones Modernas.” Harper’s Bazaar Art (En Español), no. 04, Nov. 2016, pp. 50–53.
- Pasi, Marco. “Afterthought Forms: Theosophy in Modern and Contemporary Art.” Hilma Af Klint: Visionary, edited by Kurt Almqvist and Louise Belfrage, Sweden, Bokförlaget Stolpe, 2020, pp. 93–115.
- Sharp, Chris. “Proyecto Paralelo: Algunas Lagunas.” Artforum International, 1 Mar. 2013, www.artforum.com/picks/algunas-lagunas-39375.
- Taylor-Hochberg, Amelia. “Working out of the Box: Santiago Borja.” Archinect, Dec. 2014, archinect.com/features/article/115598578/working-out-of-the-box-santiago-borja.
- Zeiger, Mimi. “Exhibiciones: Santiago Borja, Edgar Orlaineta, Tilman Wendland.” Domus, no. 04, Dec. 2012, pp. 108–11.
