= Archivo Diseño y Arquitectura =

Architecture and design museum in Mexico

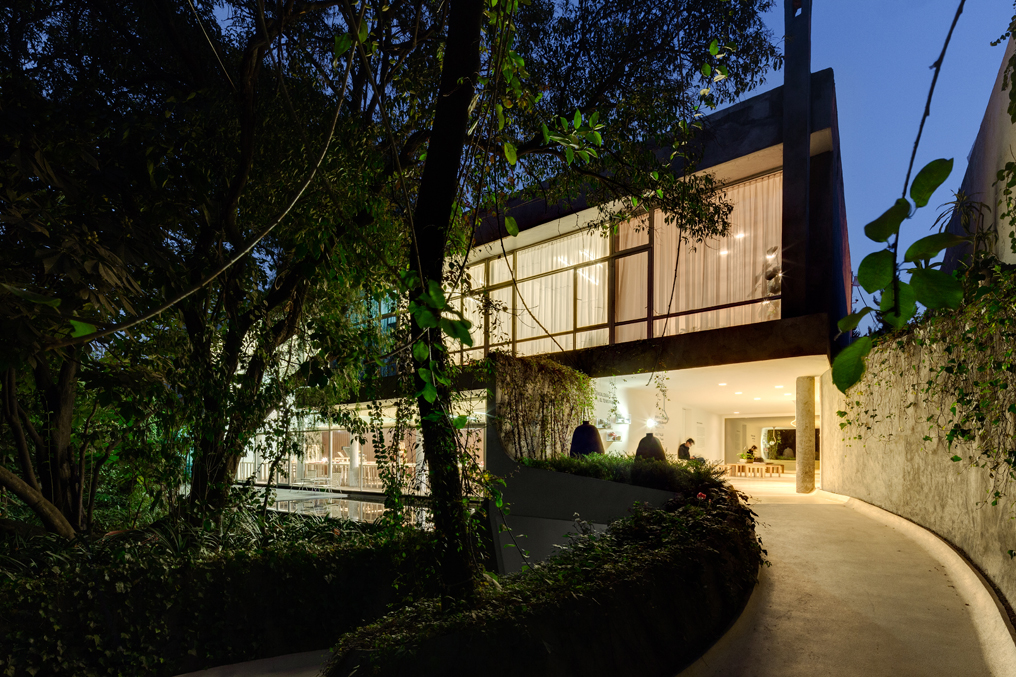
- Established: April 12, 2012; 14 years ago
- Location: General Francisco Ramírez 4, Col. Ampliación Daniel Garza, 11840 Mexico City
- Coordinates: 19°24′41″N 99°11′32″W
- Founder: Fernando Romero
- Directors: Regina Pozo (2012–2015), Mario Ballesteros (since May 2015)
- Website: www.archivonline.org

Located in Mexico City, Archivo Diseño y Arquitectura is a space dedicated to exhibiting, researching and rethinking design in its many forms and outlets. Founded by Mexican architect Fernando Romero and his wife Soumaya Slim in 2012, Archivo houses two collections: a design collection of over 1,500 objects, both international and of Mexican origin, and the personal library of the well-known Mexican modernist architect, Enrique del Moral.

== History ==
Archivo Diseño y Arquitectura is housed in a 1952 modernist dwelling built by artist and architect Arturo Chávez Paz, located in the traditional Tacubaya neighborhood of Mexico City, on Francisco Ramírez n.4, next door to the World Heritage Site, Luis Barragán House and Studio. Chávez Paz –who never finished architecture school– was an artist and illustrator working closely for the modernist avant-garde abstractionist group with the likes of Mathias Goeritz and Henry Moore. He was in charge of all the illustrations for Platería Ortega, Barragan´s first clients in the neighborhood for whom he built Casa Ortega in 1943. The other only Chávez Paz building known to date is the house on the same street, Francisco Ramírez 13. Archivo also faces the former house of Enrique del Moral, now contemporary art gallery, LABOR. Thus, this small corner of the city is a little-known landmark of Modern Mexican architecture and an important cultural destination, now known as the ¨Tacubaya Triangle¨.

== Public program ==
Since it opened, Archivo has hosted over twelve design exhibitions, including Happiness is a Hot (and Cool) Sponge, curated by Guillermo Santamarina, Assembly Instructions, curated by Mexican Architecture office Productora and The Letter E is Everywhere, curated by Berlin-based graphic designer Manuel Raeder. Archivo also hosts a number of workshops, talks, and other events open to the public, that have contributed to expanding the field of design in Mexico.

In 2014, Archivo published its first book, Tradition and modernity, with support from Chicago's Graham Foundation.

== Exhibiting Artists ==
- Mario García Torres
- Alberto Odériz
- Amor Muñoz
- Edwina Portocarrero
- Isauro Huizar
- Pablo López Luz
- Pedro Reyes
- Tercerunquinto
- Virginia Colwel
- Lake Verea
- Christoph Draeger

== Archivo Pavilion ==
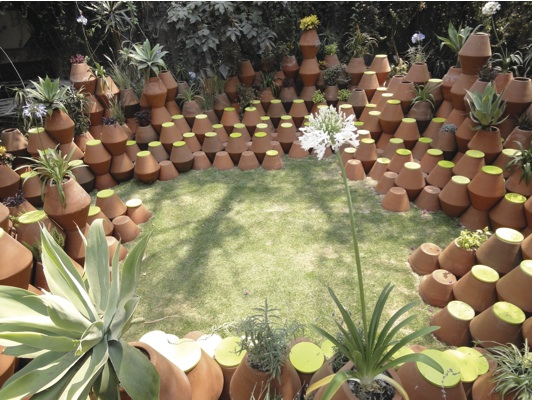
Pabellon Archivo.

In 2012, Archivo held an open international competition to build its first summer pavilion: Pabellón Archivo The competition drew more than 400 proposals from designers and architect all over the world. An international jury selected Pedro&Juana as the winning proposal, and the pavilion was inaugurated in April 2013.

== See also ==
- List of design museums
