= Fernando Romero =

Fernando Romero may refer to:

- Fernando Romero (architect), (born 1971), Mexican architect and philanthropist
  - Fernando Romero (company), architecture and industrial design firm started by the Mexican architect
- Fernando Romero (baseball) (born 1994), Dominican former professional baseball pitcher
- Fernando Romero (footballer) (born 2000), Paraguayan professional footballer
