= Fred Dewey =

Fred Dewey may refer to:

- Fred Dewey (footballer)
- Fred Dewey (author)
