= Pablo López Luz =

Mexican photographer (born 1979)

Pablo López Luz (born Mexico City, 1979) is a Mexican photographer. López Luz has participated in numerous solo and group exhibitions around the world. He has won multiple awards, including the Syngenta Photography Award and the Alt+1000 Photography Award. He has also published several books of his photographs. In 2022 Javier Sirvent wrote that Pablo López Luz "can be considered among the main figures in contemporary Mexican photography".

== Career ==
Pablo López Luz grew up involved in the art world, since his father was a gallerist in Mexico City. After studying at the Universidad Iberoamericana in Mexico City, López Luz completed a master's degree in Visual Art at NYU in 2006. López Luz has exhibited in different venues including the Museo Tamayo, Arróniz Arte Contemporaneo, Museo Experimental el Eco, and the Fondation Cartier. His work is part of the collection of the San Francisco Museum of Modern Art, and the Escalette Collection at Chapman University, among other institutions.

Although he is well known for his aerial photographs, his projects are more varied. For example, for Piedra Volcánica he was commissioned by el Eco Museum to take a series of images about the museum's building, designed by architect Mathias Goeritz. He has also worked extensively outside Mexico, for example in Romana Tropical he took photographs of the architecture of several Cuban cities.

In 2010 he won the third edition of the Photography Prize of the Instituto Italo-Latinoamericano (IILA) in Rome. In 2015, López Luz won the Project Launch Juror’s Award from CENTER for his Frontera project. In 2019 he was a finalist for the sixth edition of the MAST Foundation Grant for Industry and Photography.

He has given lectures about his work such as the 2021 Anderman Photography Lecture at the Denver Art Museum.

== Artistic style ==
In 2014 Mariela Sancari wrote about project Terrazo: "His images are an interesting example of reinterpretation of traditional Mexican landscape imagery, addressing this from the men-environment point of view". Alasdair Foster wrote in 2020: "Through his photographs, Pablo López Luz seeks to investigate the relationships between human beings and the space they inhabit". Arturo Soto wrote in a review of López Luz' 2019 book Bajo la Sombra de la Pirámide: "There aren’t many Mexican photographers working in the manner of Pablo López Luz, combining the vision and thematic focus of the New Topographics (particularly those of Lewis Baltz), the methodology of the Düsseldorf School, and the lyricism of Graciela Iturbide". He has been mentioned along artists whose work is based on twentieth-century Maya Revival architecture, such as Eduardo Abaroa and Lourdes Grobet.
