= Museo Experimental El Eco =

Art gallery in Mexico City

Museo Experimental el Eco
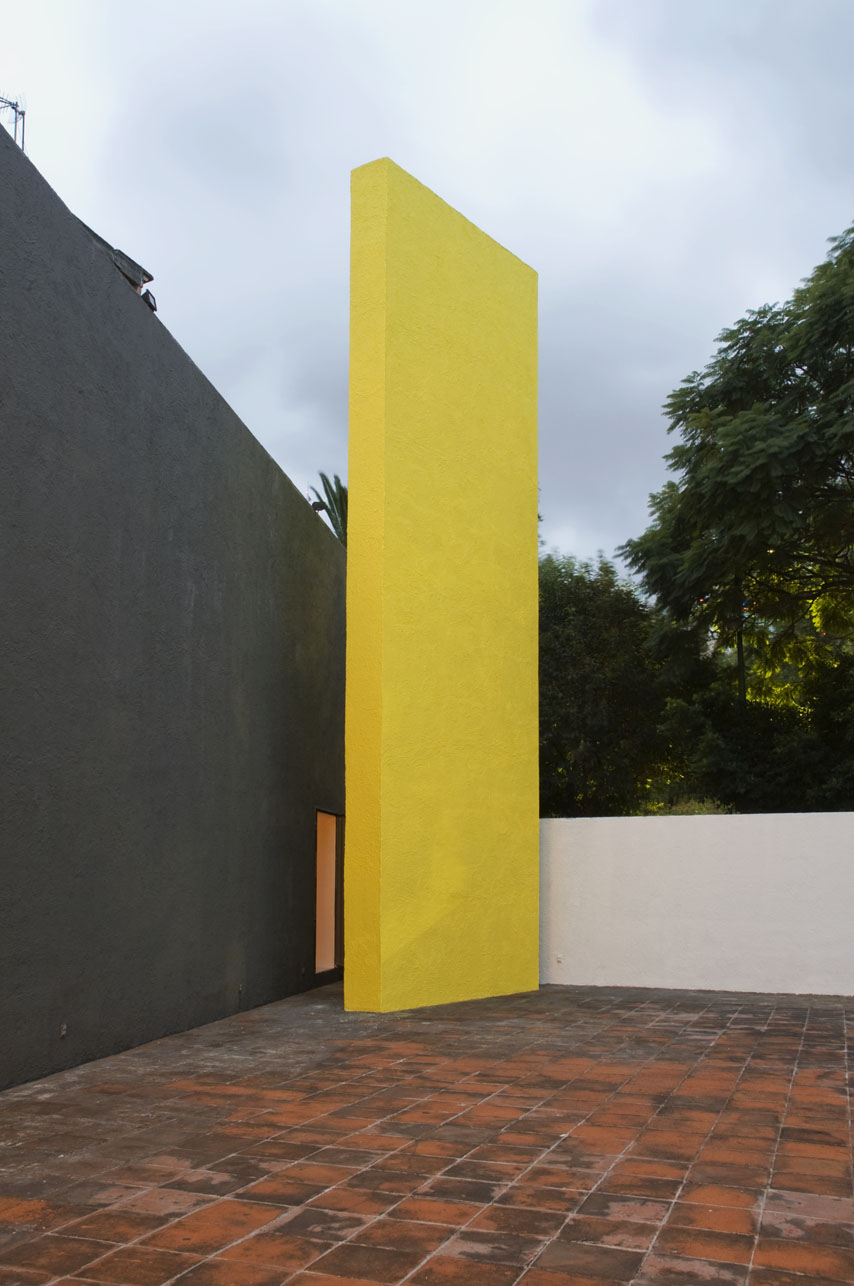
- Museo Experimental el Eco, Mexico City, Mexico
- Location in Mexico City
- Established: 1952; 74 years ago
- Location: Sullivan 43; Colonia San Rafael; Cuauhtémoc; Mexico, 06470
- Coordinates: 19°26′00″N 99°09′40″W
- Director: Paola Santoscoy
- Public transit access: Mexico City Metrobús, lines A1, A2, A3 and A5
- Website: eleco.unam.mx

The Museo Experimental El Eco is a contemporary art gallery in the centre of Mexico City, Mexico. It was designed by sculptor Mathias Goeritz, a Mexican artist of German origin who worked closely with the Mexican architect Luis Barragán. Originally built in 1952–53, the gallery was extended by FR-EE/Fernando Romero Enterprise in 2007 "to expand its offices and special services to improve daily operations".

== History of the building ==
In 1952, businessman Daniel Mont commissioned artist Mathias Goeritz to build a place that would articulate a new relationship between his commercial interests of a restaurant-bar and the avant-garde spirit of some cultural actors of the time, with the intention of finding something different from what was established. Under the premise "do whatever you want", Goeritz conceived the space on Sullivan Street in Mexico City. It was designed as a poetic structure whose layout of corridors, ceilings, walls, rooms and openings led its visitors to reflect their experience of space in an emotional act; This concept challenged the dominant interests of functionalism in architecture at that time. Based on his "Manifesto of emotional architecture", his writings also refer to inspiration of religious experiences and Gothic and Baroque architecture.

Goeritz conceived the building as a penetrable sculpture. This space was the creation of an unprecedented platform for the arts in the context of Mexican and international art of the 1950s.

In 2004, the Universidad Nacional Autónoma de México bought the building which re-opened its doors on 7 September 2005 after many months of restoration work to bring the building back to its original state. The project was intended to revive Goeritz's architectural legacy.

== Pabellón Eco ==
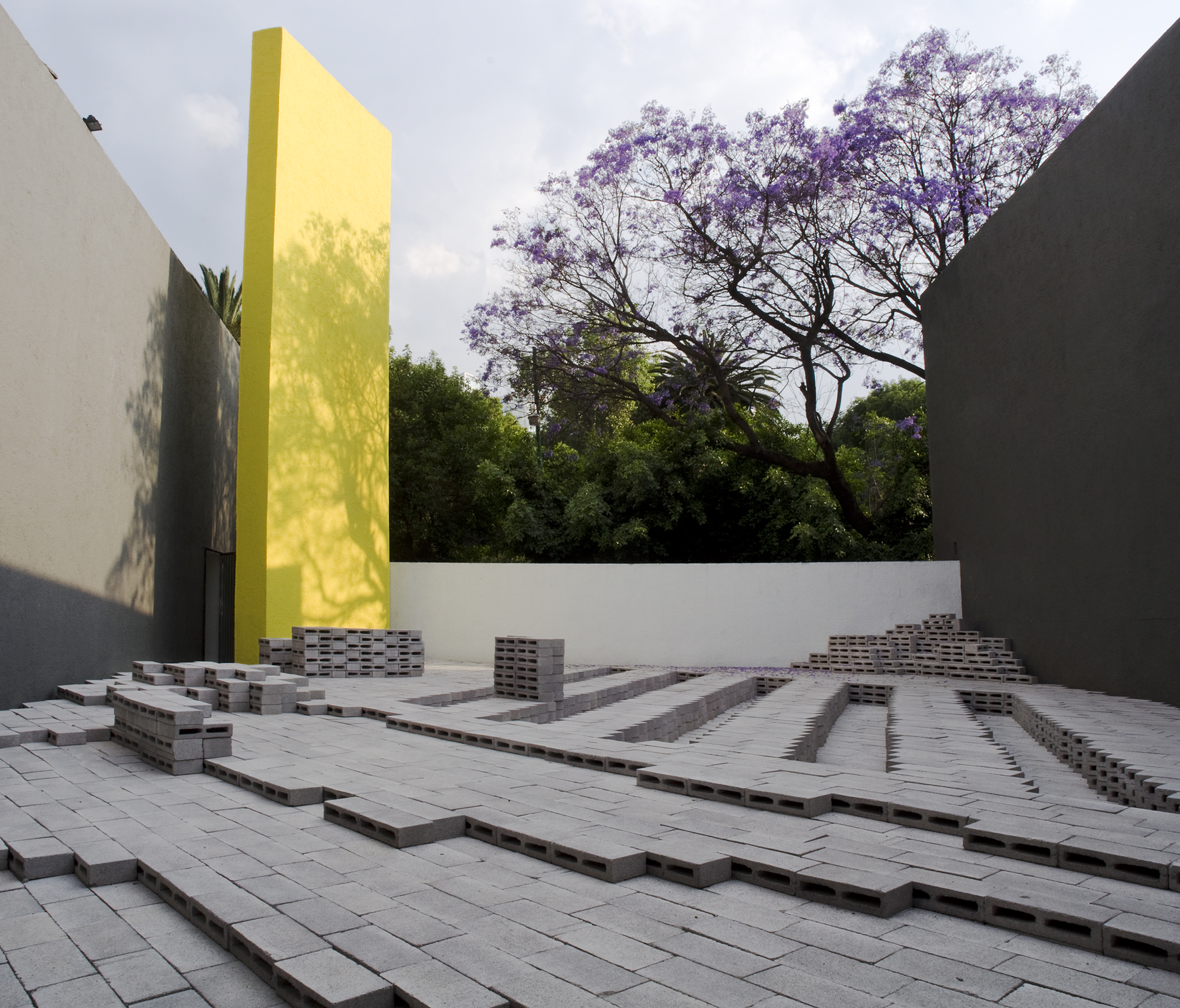
Pavilion for architecture competition at the Museo Experimental el Eco in Mexico City.

In 2008, the museum initiated a national architecture competition to continue the legacy of spatial experimentation that hosts an interdisciplinary art program. The project offers a platform for young Mexican architects and is co-produced with Buró—Buró, an independent non-profit cultural office. The museum also organizes a conference around experimental architecture called Pabellón Eco: Panorama.

Pavilion winners:

- 2010: Frida Escobedo
- 2011: Estudio MMX
- 2012: Luis Aldrete
- 2013: Estudio Macías-Peredo
- 2015: Taller Capital
- 2016: APRDELESP
- 2018: Taller TO
- 2020: Cronoboros

== Publications ==
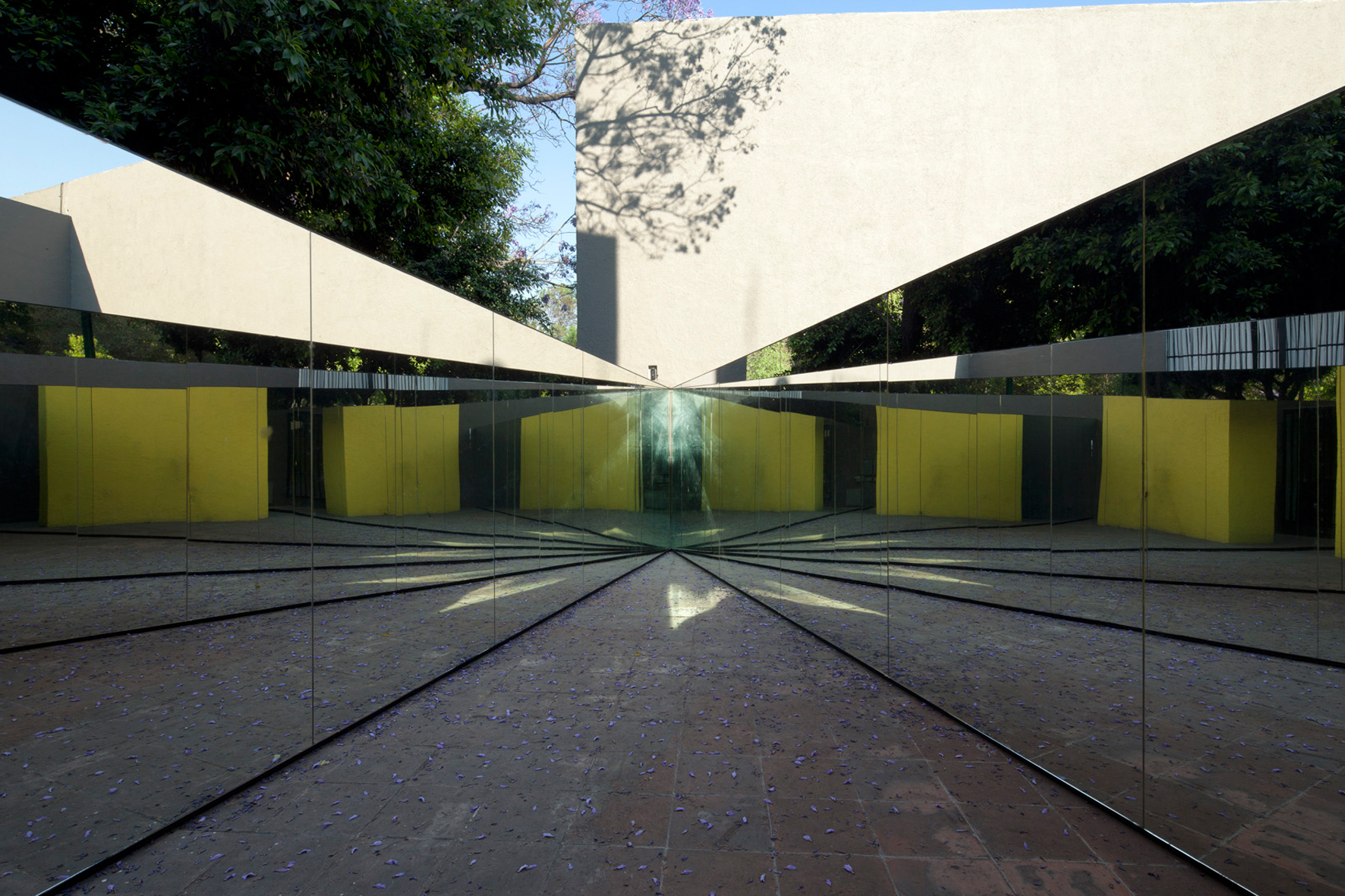
Luis Aldrete was the 2013 Winner of the architecture pavilion competition at Museo Experimental el Eco in Mexico City. View from the interior.

- Ensayo de Miguel A. González Virgen, 2006
- Estamos hartos (otra vez), Mauricio Marcin and Ida Rodríguez, 2014
- Autodestrucción 2, Abraham Cruzvillegas, 2014
- La Chinche (2014-2015), Mauricio Marcin (Ed.), 2015
- Jugador como pelota, pelota como cancha, Felipe Mujica, 2015
- La disonancia de El Eco, David Miranda, 2015 (reedición 2017)
- La perla de la ostra, Abraham Cruzvillegas, Gabriel Escalante and Carlos Reygadas, 2019
- La conquista del Pedregal, Julio García Murillo and David Miranda, 2019
- Abstracción Temporal. Museo Experimental el Eco (2010), Tobias Ostrander (Ed.), 2011
- Arquitectura Emocional. Museo Experimental el Eco (2011), Macarena Hernández (Ed.), 2012
- Re vista #1 (2012), Macarena Hernández (Ed.), 2013
- Re vista #2 (2013), Macarena Hernández and Luis Felipe Ortega (Eds.), 2014
- Re vista #3 (2014), Macarena Hernández (Ed.), 2016
- Re vista #4 (2015 y 2016), Macarena Hernández (Ed.), 2018
