= Frida Escobedo =

Mexican architect

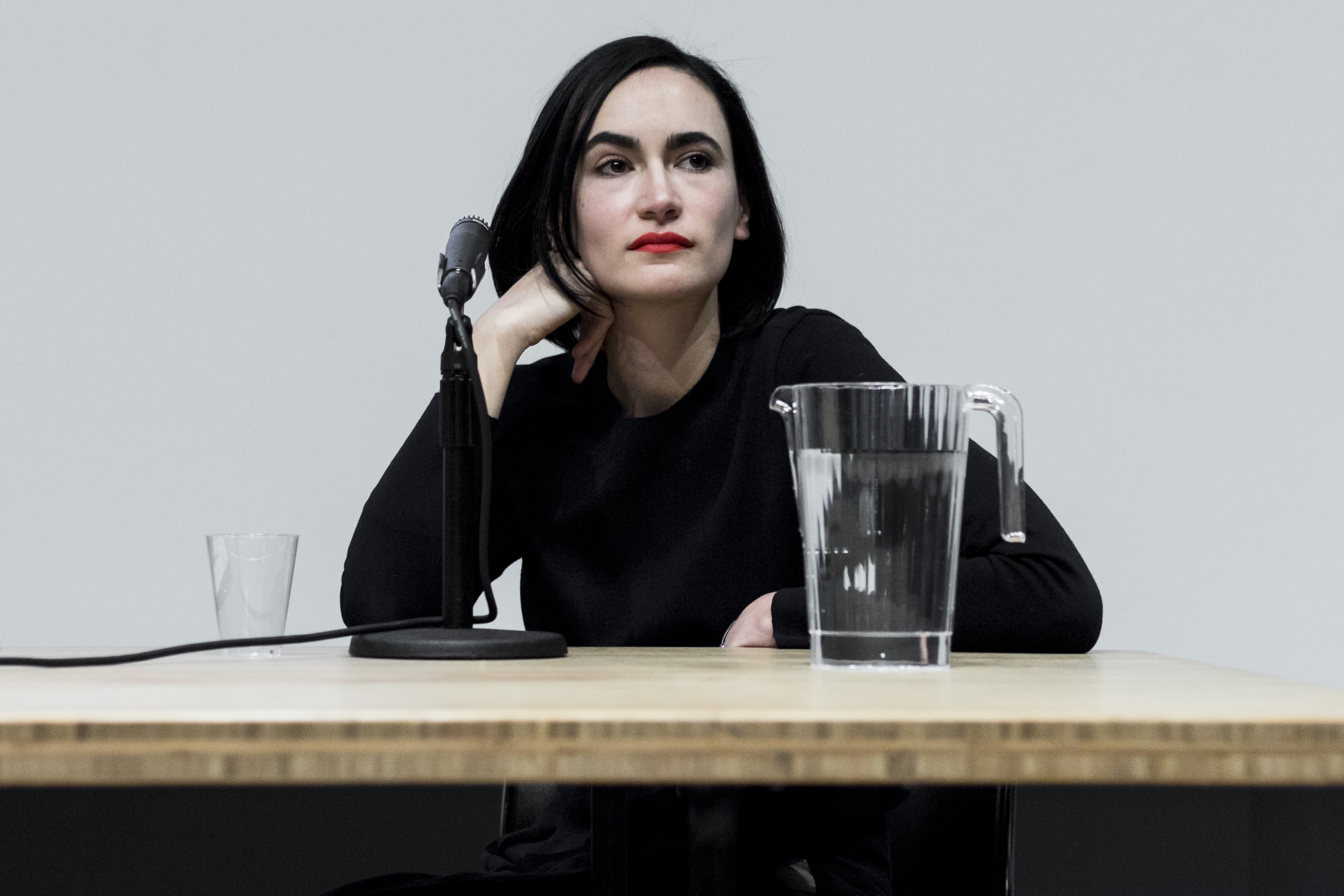
Frida Escobedo
- Born: 1979 (age 46–47); Mexico City, Mexico
- Education: Universidad Iberoamericana
- Occupation: Architect
- Buildings: La Tallera

Frida Escobedo (born 1979) is a Mexican architect. She specifically designs and restores urban spaces: housing, community centers, art venues, and hotels. When creating, Escobedo illustrates her works within a general theme of time, not in a historical context but rather in a social context. She founded her own architectural and Design Studio in 2006 which is located in Mexico City. Escobedo is known for creating temporary and interactive works which can accommodate multiple intended purposes.

In 2018, she became the youngest architect to work on the Serpentine Pavilion, and the second woman to be invited after Zaha Hadid designed the first in 2000. Her architectural work includes projects such as the courtyard at La Tallera in Cuernavaca, while her artistic undertakings can be seen in places such as the Museo Experimental el Eco in Mexico City or the Victoria & Albert Museum in London. Escobedo was named one of the top 30 most influential architects in London by ArchDaily because of her work on the Serpentine Pavilion.

== Education and career ==
Escobedo studied architecture at the Universidad Iberoamericana and received a master's degree in Art, Design and the Public Domain at Harvard‘s Graduate School of Design. Since 2007 she has been teaching at the Universidad Iberoamericana. She has participated as a judge for the Harvard Graduate School of Design, Boston Architectural College and the Monterrey Institute of Technology in Mexico. Escobedo has taught classes at Columbia University’s Graduate School of Architecture, Planning, and Preservation, Harvard Graduate School of Design, and the Architectural Association School of Architecture in London.

Escobedo is currently still based in Mexico City working in Colonia Juarez central area, where she works as an independent architect in an office with nine other colleagues. she enjoys collaborating on projects with other architects.

In 2003, with Alejandro Alarcón, she founded the "[Perro Rojo]" studio. One of the most recognized works is "Casa Negra", which was designed in complete freedom by a person who wished to live surrounded by nature. Her first residential project was influenced by the function of a camera obscura, in the third instalment of a series of short movies about the Mexican architect. The block structure is mounted on four tubes and lifted above the earth, and the rooms are located inside this structure. The design was finished with a large window to create total visibility of the City of Mexico, evoking the sensation of being behind a large camera.

In 2006, "Perro Rojo" was dissolved and Escobedo began her own architecture and design firm. She has designed under her own name from the firms inception to the current day.

In 2010, her installation at the Museo Experimental el Eco featured moveable cement slabs intended to accommodate lectures and speakers.

In 2013 she created a circular arena and in 2015 designed a series of mirrored complexes in the courtyard of the Victoria and Albert Museum. When creating, Escobedo illustrates her works within a general theme of time, but not in a historical context but rather in a social context.

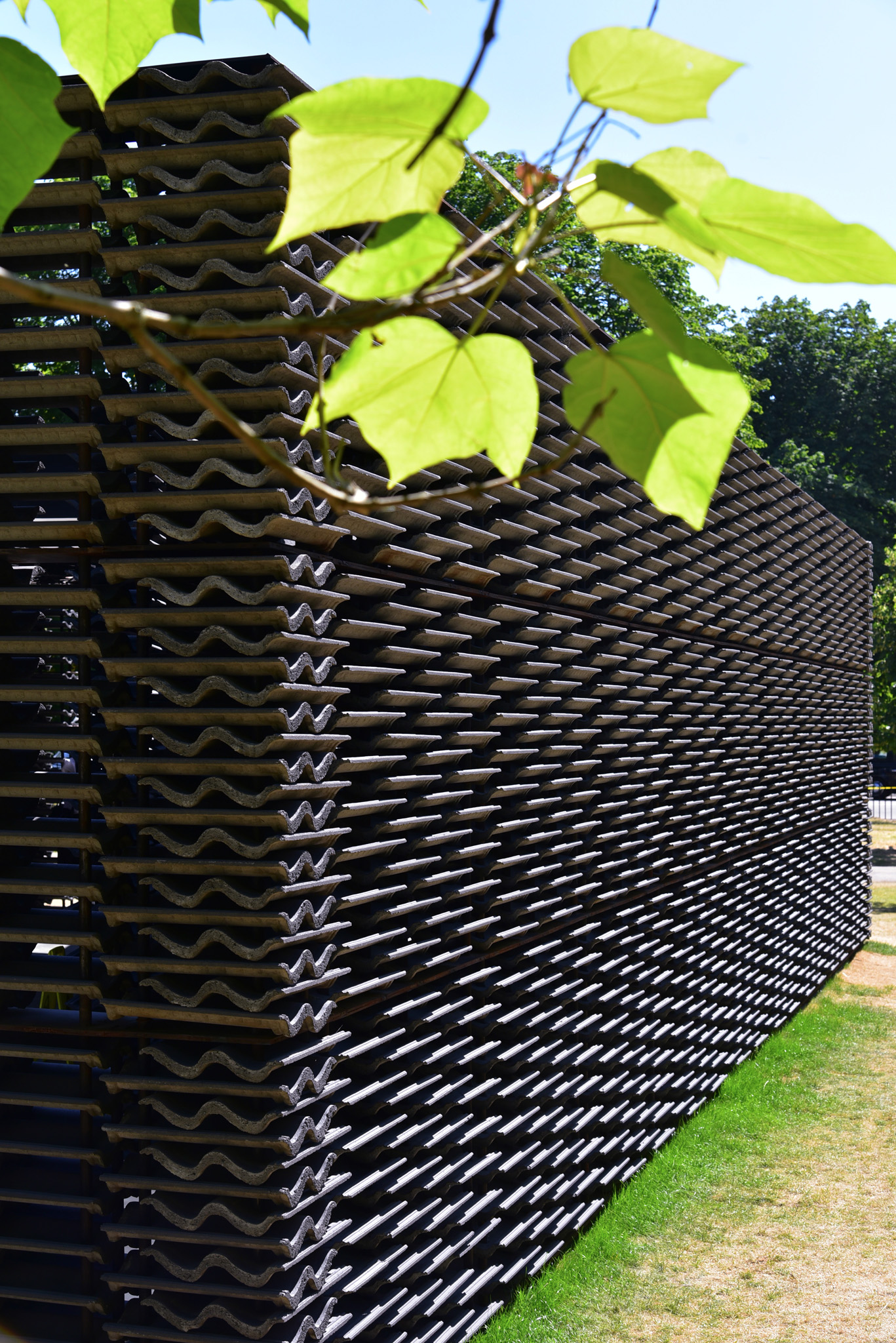
Frida Escobedo, Serpentine Pavilion, 2018, London

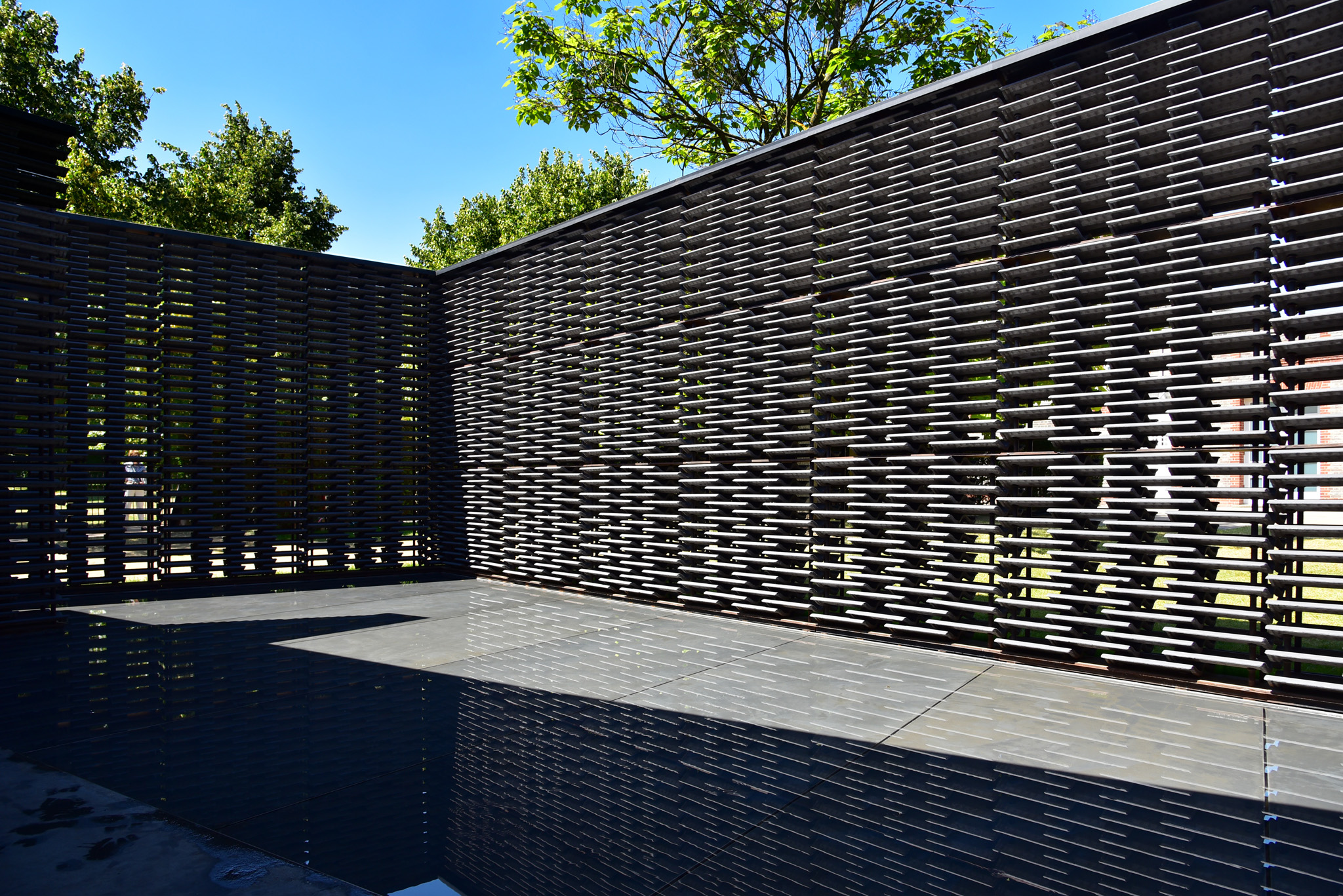
Frida Escobedo, Serpentine Pavilion, 2018, London

In 2018 Escobedo designed the Serpentine Pavilion for the London's Kensington Gardens. In her design she used materials and architectural styles from both Britain and Mexico in order to create a work that would capture the historical and cultural aspects of each country. The exhibit was open to the public from June 15 to October 7, 2018. The design of the Pavilion is an allusion to courtyards typically attached to houses in Mexico. The structure featured latticed walls of British made cement which allow both light and wind to pass through; the open, yet enclosed structure Escobedo designed is intended to create an illusion of secrecy. She also makes use of a small pool and a mirrored ceiling which creates a contrast between light and shadow that changes throughout the day as the sun moves angles, the shadows that shift resembles the passage of the day.

In 2019, Escobedo designed a Mexican Pre-Columbian inspired bag for Salvatore Ferragamo S.p.A., using concrete block patterning inspired by her design of the Mar Tirreno 86 house in Mexico City.

In 2019, Escabado sourced rammed earth from the Mixteca region of Oaxaca, Mexico for the bricks in her design of Aesop's Park Slope, Brooklyn location. “It has a completely different texture and tone [than Brooklyn brick]. It's really special," says Escobedo. Her team arranged the bricks in stacks with opposing diagonal rows creating a grid that just out into the store. Escabado studied Anni Albers' patterns and drawing to aid in the design of this grid. The storefront is a 19th-century building at the corner of Fifth Avenue and President Street and had formerly been a veterinarian clinic that specialized in cats. The Park Slope location is her seventh collaboration with Aesop.

In 2022, Escobedo was selected to renovate the Oscar L. Tang and H.M. Agnes Hsu-Tang Wing of the Metropolitan Museum of Art. Metropolitan Museum of Art director Max Hollein said "Frida Escobedo is an outstanding architect of our time. In her practice, she wields architecture as a way to create powerful spatial and communal experiences, and she has shown dexterity and sensitivity in her elegant use of material while bringing sincere attention to today’s socioeconomic and ecological issues. Already through her partnership, Frida has demonstrated her vision to create enthralling galleries that will challenge the embedded hierarchies of our history and chart a more accessible trajectory for the new wing." Escobedo is the first woman to design a wing at The Met.

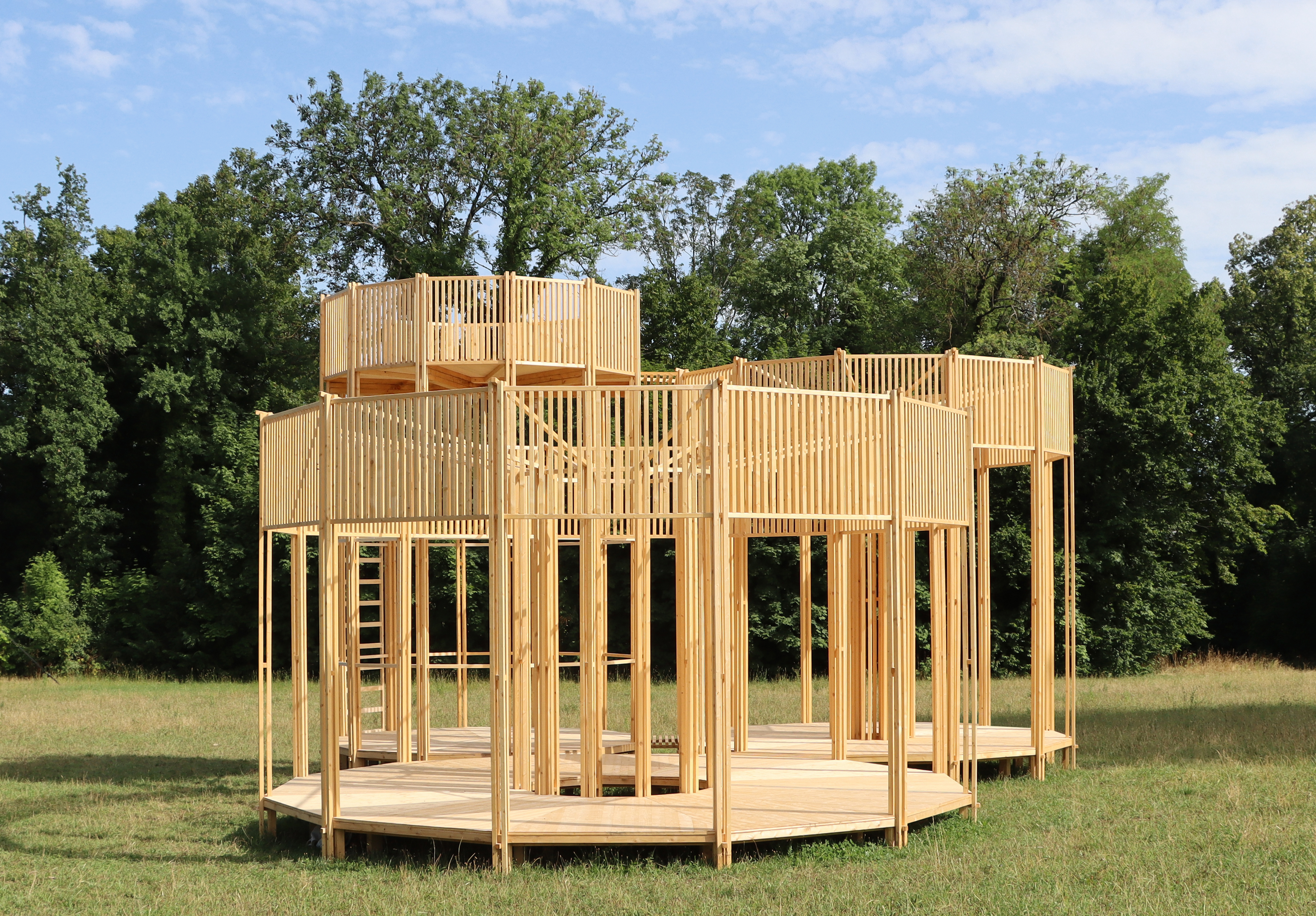
Frida Escobedo, System_01, 2022, Geneva

With each new project, Escobado delves into multiple references before producing the proposed artwork. In the early stages of the circular construction System_01 built for the exhibition Open House in Geneva, for example, she mentioned the archeological sites of Stonehenge in England and Nabta Playa in Upper Egypt with their megalithic monuments arranged in a circle, but also the tepees of the Great Plains Indians and the huts of lake-dwellers as we have long imagined them on the shores of Swiss lakes. Louise Bourgeois’s drawings of spiderwebs are just as much a part of the architect’s references as Archimedes’ treatise Measurement of a Circle. The three cylindrical wooden elements are differently proportioned in terms of their circumference and height, designed according to mathematical relationships, and largely open, like 360° viewpoints on the park. They form spaces that the public is invited to take over and use. Escobedo defends the idea that an architectural design is always brought to completion by the way it is inhabited.

== Early years ==
As a child Escobedo accompanied her father to the hospital where he worked as a doctor. The hospital is where she spent her time staring out the window at near by housing complexes. In an Interview with Architectural Digest, Escobedo says she was "trying to understand how space reflects people’s personalities,” by looking out the window. She reveals later in the interview that people's emotions and relationships are revealed by building's design.

Escobedo didn't always know she was going to be an architect, "Some people have like a very clear idea of what they want to do in life very early on. I didn't. I was 17 when I had to decide what career I needed to choose". However Escobedo never doubted she was going to be in a creative field. after her first week of architecture school she knew architecture was her passion.

== Works ==
- 2004 – Casa Negra (in collaboration with Alejandro Alarcón) – Mexico City
- 2006 – Restoration at the Hotel Boca Chica (in collaboration with José Rojas) – Acapulco, Mexico
- 2008 – Project by Ordos 100
- 2008 – Hotel Boca Chica
- 2010 – Pavilion at the Museo Experimental el Eco – Mexico City
- 2010 – Hotel Boca Chica (in collaboration with José Rojas) – Acapulco, Guerrero, Mexico
- 2012 – Restoration de La Tallera, Cuernavaca, Morelos, Mexico
- 2013 – Plaza Cívica – Lisbon
- 2014 – Libreria Octavio Paz – Ciudad de Mexico, Mexico
- 2015 – Installation at the Victoria & Albert Museum
- 2015 – Aesop Wynwood – Miami FL, EUA
- 2016 – Aesop Coconut Grove – Miami FL, EUA
- 2016 – GSB Stanford at Highland Halls, GSB Stanford University – Palo Alto CA, EUA
- 2017 – Aesop West Loop – Chicago IL, EUA
- 2017 – Exhibition at Arthur Ross Architecture Gallery – Columbia University, New York
- 2017 – Del territorio al habitante at Laboratorio de Vivienda Infonavit – Apan, Hidalgo, Mexico
- 2018 – Serpentine Pavilion 2018
- 2018 – Casa Julia (Julia House), Ocuilan, State of Mexico, Mexico
- 2019 – Aesop Park Slope – Brooklyn NY, EUA
- 2019 – Mar Tirreno – Ciudad de Mexico, Mexico
- 2020 – Niddo Cafe (in collaboration with Mauricio Mesta) – Ciudad de Mexico, Mexico
- 2022 – System_01 Pavilion – Open House exhibition, Geneva
- 2022 (announced, opening TBA) – Oscar L. Tang and H.M. Agnes Hsu-Tang Wing (renovation), The Met– New York, NY.
- 2023 - Boca de Agua Eco-Hotel - Bacalar
- 2025 - Qatar Ministry of Foreign Affairs HQ, Doha

== Awards and prizes ==
- 2004 – Young Creators' Scholarship from the Fondo Nacional para la Cultura y las Artes, Mexico
- 2009 – Winner of the Young Architects Forum, part of Architectural Association of New York.
- 2010 – Marcelo Zambrano Scholarship
- 2013 – Nominated for Arc Vision Prize for Women
- 2012 – Her work was featured at the Venice Biennale of Architecture, at the Mission Cultural Center for the Latino Arts in San Francisco, and at Storefront for Art and Architecture.
- 2012 – Finalist for the programme Rolex Mentor and Protégé Arts Initiative.
- 2014 – Ibero-American Biennale of Architecture and Urbanism Prize (IX BIAU)
- 2016 – Emerging Architecture Award, Architectural Review
- 2017 – Architectural League Emerging Voices
