= Fred Dewey (author) =

American author (1957–2021)

Fred Dewey (July 11, 1957 – June 2, 2021) was a writer, artist, publisher, educator, and civic activist. He was the co-founder of the Neighborhood Councils Movement in Los Angeles. He directed the Beyond Baroque Literary Arts Center in Los Angeles from 1996 to 2010 and has edited and published over twenty books on Ammiel Alcalay, Simone Forti, Jean-Luc Godard, Daniel Berrigan, Abdellatif Laabi, Jack Hirschman, Christoph Draeger, Ed Ruscha, Diane di Prima.

In the mid-1990s, Dewey founded The Hannah Arendt Working Group in Los Angeles. In 2010, Dewey led the free, public seminar on the works of German-born American political theorist Hannah Arendt in Berlin, Paris, London, Oslo, Amsterdam, and Los Angeles, at public spaces, squats, and universities.

Dewey was on the faculty of the fine arts graduate program at ArtCenter College of Design in Pasadena, CA. He also taught at the Freie Universität in Berlin and Cal Arts in Valencia, California

== Education ==
Fred Dewey graduated from Phillips Exeter Academy in New Hampshire, and studied semiotics at Brown University.

== Beyond Baroque ==
During his time as director of Beyond Baroque, Dewey created the publishing house Beyond Baroque Books and launched The World Beyond Poetry Festival in 2000.

== Publications ==
- The School of Public Life, Errant Bodies Press, 2014
- from an apparent contradiction in Arendt to a working group method, re:public, 2016
- Declaration, Beyond Baroque Books, 2009
- A Little History, Beyond Baroque Books, 2013
- Truth Etc., Beyond Baroque Books, 2006
- Site Specific Sound, 2004
- From the Warring Factions, UpSet Press, Incorporated, 2013
- he Lowndes County Idea: Two Conversations, 2009
- Lucas Reiner: Los Angeles Trees, Prestel, 2008
