= Mario García Torres =

Mexican conceptual artist

- Born: 1975 (age 50–51); Monclova, Coahuila, Mexico
- Education: California Institute of the Arts, University of Monterrey
- Occupation: Artist

Mario García Torres (born 1975) is a critically acclaimed visual and conceptual artist. He has used various media, including film, sound, performance, ‘museographic installations’ and video as a means to create his art.

García Torres often mentioned untold or ‘minor’ histories, as departing points for his work. He has re-created historical exhibitions and has even ‘completed’ unfinished artworks, often blurring original and reenactment, past and present, while questioning universal ideas about truth, certainty and time –all core ideas in the development of his body of work. During the early 2000s García Torres stopped dating his works; In so doing, he undermines the narrative of an oeuvre and career as a progressive evolution over time. n.d. (no date) often accompanies, since then, the work's title, and has become a signature of the artist.

His work has been shown at the Museo Nacional Centro de Arte Reina Sofia, Madrid; the Walker Art Center in Minneapolis, the Hammer Museum in Los Ángeles, and the Stedelijk Museum in Amsterdam among many others. He has participated in international biennials like the Venice Biennale, the São Paulo Biennial and the Documenta in Kassel. His work is collected by institutions like the Museum of Modern Art, New York; the Guggenheim Museums; the Tate Modern in London; and the Pompidou Center in Paris.

== Biography ==
Mario García Torres was born in the Mexican city of Monclova in 1975. The interest of Mario García Torres for art started a very young age, as he accompanied his mother in their hometown's museum, where she volunteered as a guide. He received his Bachelor of Fine Arts from the University of Monterrey in Mexico in 1998. While a student in Monterrey, he started getting interested in conceptual art. García Torres cited a group of his professors that were linked with American abstract expressionism as an influence in that direction. Before continuing his studies in the United States, and earned his Master of Fine Arts by the California Institute of the Arts in 2005, as a Fulbright grantee, the artist worked as an "electronic arts curator" at the Museo Carrillo Gil in México City. In 2007 he received the Cartier Award at the Frieze Art Fair. He is a member of the Artists Board of SOMA -a Mexico City arts organization.

== Early work ==
The work that first attracted attention to the artist negotiated obscure events associated with conceptual art of the 1960s and 1970s, with the use of a variety of media. His early work, based on past events around the history of conceptual art, tried to create new ideas and meanings through them. García Torres used minor events for the creation of his narratives, as he believed that "some of them still have the potential to trigger questions both regarding their own nature, and regarding historiography".

In "In Some Places I Had Seen Before Moving to L.A.", he presents locations around L.A. in an attempt to reproduce the image he had about the city, based in what he saw in films or conceptual art works. His first solo exhibition in the United States presented "What Happens in Halifax Stays in Halifax". It was triggered during a conversation about art concepts with Jan Mot, and was initiated as a historic research project covering a 1969 art project which was assigned to NSCAD University students in David Askevold's class by artist Robert Barry. García Torres' work consisted of black and white slides and produced a reunion of the 1969 project class.

García Torres' Share-e-Nau Wanderings (A Film Treatment) was the artist's first attempt to approach the life and work of Alighiero Boetti, by creating a series of fictitious fax sheets, describing García Torres' imaginary trip in Kabul.

The project would occupy seven years of research and the production of a number of works. "¿Alguna vez has visto la nieve caer?" is a 50-minute slide show of black and white photographs of Kabul, taken by as anonymous photographers, and accompanied by sound. The project comprised photographs taken in the seventies, but the artist placed his work after the September 11 attacks, in an attempt to mingle different times and trigger the audience to question what it sees. With "Tea", García Torres documents in film his journey to One Hotel, the hotel operated by Alighiero Boetti in Kabul, further exploring his knowledge of Kabul and Boetti while tackling the also tense political climate in his own country. This was an important part of his contribution to Documenta 13.

With "Je ne sais si c'en est la cause", and "What Doesn't Kill You Makes You Stronger" García Torres gave documentation for two past works: Martin Kippenberger's Museum of Modern Art Syros, and Daniel Buren's in-situ mosaics in Saint Croix. His work "My Westphalia Days" is a road movie containing fictitious events of the four-day disappearance of Michael Asher's trailer, which was presented in Skulptur Projekte Münster since 1977.

"Unspoken Dailies", is a 66-minute feature film, showing actor Diego Luna reading the film's script written by García Torres for the first time while being filmed in an artist studio in Mexico City.

== Monologues and lectures ==
In 2007, García Torres created what would become the first of a number of theater monologues. Alan Smithee, the pseudonym directors used to disown projects they were dissatisfied with, is personified in "I am not a Flopper". The work is a monologue which García Torres co-wrote with philosopher Aaron Schuster, and is an effort to discuss created and invented concepts. I am not a Flopper was first presented as a stage piece in London where played the character. Years later it was presented as a video work at the Hammer Museum, where David Dastmalchian did the monologue.

In 2015, inspired by Seth Siegelaub, an independent curator, gallerist, and publisher who was influential to the emergence of Conceptual art in the 1960s, the artist co-wrote with Alan Page "The Causality of Hesitance". Centered on Siegelaub's interest in theories about time, this "thought-provoking performance" spans a range of topics, from the psychology of hesitating to the contradictory aspects of economic progress. "The Cordiality Paradox" is a performative speech carried out by ‘an actor and a robotic tortoise,’ that takes on two philosophical paradoxes – conceptual notions in the foundations of mathematics – and enlivens them for the layperson through an anecdotal narrative recounting life-changing moments and encounters. The piece is "a nonstop operation that could have been either a philosophical treatise or the chatter of a confused mind" according to Noemi Smolik.

In 2012, García Torres presented a working version of "Have You Ever Seen the Snow", as part of the "Artists on Artists" series at Dia Art Foundation in New York. The lecture became latter a slide show piece presented afterwards at the Museo Nacional Centro de Arte Reina Sofía in Madrid, and latter became a fundamental part of the artist contribution to Documenta 13, Kassel.

"Five Feet High and Rising", is a work in the form of a lecture where García Torres tracks a somewhat esoteric cultural history of rivers. The piece, which also exist as an installation presented at the Sharjah Biennial in the United Arab Emirates in 2017, chart and merge different stories of movement, migration, and fragmentation while drifting through a combination of images and popular music that make reference to small and large waterways. In 2013, García Torres gave a short lecture where he argued against the use of the word "Latinamerica", in the context of the Art Basel Miami Beach.

As his participation to "An Inquiry: Modes of Encounter", an exhibition at the Times Museum, in Guangzhou, China, in 2019, the artist wrote "If Only I'd Thought of The Right Words" a monologue for an Artificial Intelligence character. The project was made in collaboration with the Chinese tech company Sogou. In the video piece, the avatar speaks randomly as if she has been left alone at a live TV news broadcast.

Other lectures that are considered works of art are "Like You, I Dig, I Dig In, I Dig Into, and I Dig Up Art Too", presented at the a LUMA Westbau symposium in Zürich, Switzerland and "Practical Demonstrations of Unique Quantic Systems As Mechanism to Produce Resonances in the Terrestrial Atmosphere", a "performatic lecture" made in collaboration with artist and musician Sol Oosel, and presented at the Torcuato di Tella University, in Buenos Aires, Argentina.

== Museographic essays ==
In 2014 García Torres started creating what he called "museographical essays"; large installations in which a very diverse number of objects and media are included. "R.R. and the Expansion of the Tropics" is a narrative of the last three decades in South Florida, combining elements on social issues in the area, climate change, and Robert Rauschenberg. An earlier work of this type was his contribution to the 2014 Berlin Biennial, for which he displayed a large number of elements in an underground room at the Ethnologistches Museum surrounding the work and legacy of musician Conlon Nancarrow. "Sounds Like Isolation to Me" also included a collaboration with Berlin pianist Nils Frahm.

"The Party Was Yesterday (But Nobody Remembers It)" was an atmospheric display created by García Torres where the memory of the events that conformed the little-known Mexican Museo Dinámico (Dynamic Museum -not to be confused with the initiative of the same name in Dakar, Senegal) were recovered throughout the display of newly created original artworks and documents from the time. During the 1960s, Manuel Larrosa and Miguel Salas Anzures created what is claimed to be the first contemporary museum in México, transforming a series of nonconformist houses designed by Larrosa into ephemeral exhibition spaces. The exhibitions included both, interventions of avant-garde theater and film directors of the time like Alejandro Jodorowsky and Juan Jose Gurrola as well as works by prominent artists like Manuel Felguerez, Lilia Carrillo and Vicente Rojo.

For "The Strange Things My Eyes See" the artist created an exhibition in the ruins of a utopian building designed and built in the 1980s by Agustín Hernández Navarro in Santa María Ahuacatitlán, México. Upon entering the derelict space, visitors encountered a scene with a number of objects, elements that had originally been part of the building itself, transformed into bronze. Regarded by the artist as "a conceptual framework", it constituted a subtle intervention that suspended notions of perception and the laws of physics. The project prompted the German gallery neugerriemschneider to open a temporary satellite space in México.

== Music ==
Although he does not consider himself a composer, music has had a recurrent presence in García Torres’ practice over the past two decades. According to Caroline Dumalin he "uses sound to transmit ideas, and also examines its circulation, exploring the social and geopolitical circumstances that have influenced its particular resonance in a given time and place." In 2004 he published "I Promise Every Time" –a collaboration with Mexican musician Mario López Landa, which was released by White Cube Gallery as a CD. It is the musical version of an older work, which consists of a written vow in which the artist pledged to "do his best as an artist".

From then on, he went on to collaborate with a long list of musicians, in order to record music for films and installations, often taking the role of lyricist and producer. Some of the García Torres’ works that feature original music are "Tea", "Je ne sais si c'en est la cause", "The Day Mankind Faded Away", "The Disjunction of Time"', "Il auriat bien pu le premettre aussi" and "Silence's Wearing Thin Here". Some works that include several tracks each have been published as EPs or LPs: "Um Cabo La, Um Porto Ca" (2013), "The Schlieren Plot" (2015), "We Make the Weather" (2014) and "Silence's Wearing Thin Here" (2018).

In 2019 García Torres presented "Falling Together in Time" a video-essay where the artist explores the themes of coincidence and happenstance, weaving together an incident in 1981 that involved Mohammad Ali with the development a number of popular songs surrounding Van Halen's 1983 hit "Jump". The 2004 video work "The Call Them Border Blasters" the artist had also used a popular song "Mexican Radio" by Wall of Voodoo "to make evident the social and political context of the northern Mexican states" through music.

== Mid-career surveys ==
In 2016, a mid-career survey of García Torres’ work was held at the Museo Rufino Tamayo and in three other venues in Mexico City. Theoretically, the works in the show were exhibited in the geographic area that would be covered if you would superimposed the Museo de Arte Sacramento -a "museum without walls" in the state of Coahuila, Mexico, conceived by the artist between 2002 and 2004- over a section of the city. According to Leslie Moody Castro "Within this fantastically complex exhibition, Garcia Torres blurs any standards regarding linear time or functional space, ultimately offering an opportunity to reconsider our understanding of reality"."Let's Walk Together" was curated by Sofia Hernández Chong-Cuy.

"Illusion Brought Me Here" -García Torres's first US survey held at the Walker Art Center, Minneapolis, in 2018 highlighted the artist as both researcher and storyteller, exploring the impulses that produce artistic thought. Encompassing the galleries, the Bentson Mediatheque, and the Walker Cinema, the presentation features 45 works created over the past two decades as well as site-specific installations conceived exclusively for the Walker. The show traveled the year after to Wiels in Brussels were the Mexican artist presented, among a number of other works, his own abridged version of a retrospective: a new sound piece entitled "Silence's Wearing Thin Here" (n.d.), composed of voices and soundtracks from his earlier works. "Illusion Brought Me Here" was curated by Vincenzo de Bellis and Caroline Dumalin.

In 2021, “The Poetics of Return” opened at the Museo de Arte Contemporáneo de Monterrey, in Mexico. Curated by Taiyana Pimentel, the exhibition established a parallel between the post-conceptual and immersive practices in historical construction for which García Torres has been known, and presented six new bodies of work created specifically for the exhibition: “This Sculpture” -the recreation of a massive sign announcing an influential avant-garde club in Monterrey from the 90's decade, Kokoloco-; a series of colorful paintings where movie spoilers are written on; a silent and almost motionless performance where Xoco, The Kid Who Loved Being Bored is the only character, and the performatic-lecture “We Shall Not Name This Feeling” in collaboration with musician and artist Sol Oosel.

== COVID-19 pandemic ==
During the COVID-19 pandemic, García Torres held an exhibition that no one, but one undisclosed person could physically visit, at the Museo Colección Jumex in Mexico City. A daily live stream broadcast the image of the gallery during normal museum hours while the artist made use of the space as a private studio to create new work. "Solo" was produced in response to the temporary closure of cultural institutions at that time and the abrupt changes to artists’ production as a result of that year's worldwide pandemic. The exhibition was a means for the artist to reconsider the relationship between the artist, the studio, the public, and the institution during the hiatus from exhibitions around the world. The works produced by Mario García Torres in “Solo” were later presented at his Berlin gallery, neugerriemschneider, and also as a solo presentation of that years online version of FIAC. During the same time, the artist promoted an initiative known as Museos Uno en Uno (museums one by one) which consisted in allowing single visitors to then-closed museums in Mexico using an online booking system. The program started in Museo Frida Kahlo and Anahuacalli in the country's capital.

In September 2021, “It Must Have Been a Tuesday” a work by García Torres was presented at the Unlimited section of Art Basel, in Switzerland. The work consists of 164 letter-size photocopies pasted onto linen on stretchers equating the number of days the artist's studio was closed during the first pandemic lockdown in México City. The work begins with an otherwise blank page where the text ‘Cerrado temporalmente’ -Spanish for ‘temporarily closed’ is written and which they artist affixed to his studio door. The second piece is a photocopy of the original sign and all following pieces repeat the act of coping and posting it on the studio door every day until the studio could be reopened. The increasing distortion produced by the machine the text becomes progressively illegible resulting in the gradual breakdown of the message and the creation of an abstract composition.

== Curatorial ==
A curatorial practice has sporadically appeared in the work of Mario García Torres through his career. His first known exercises happened in 1999 in Monterrey where he curated “Fit Inn”, a group exhibition hosted in a cheap downtown hotel. As institutional curator at the Museo Carrillo Gil in Mexico City he curated solo presentations of Iñaki Bonillas, Olía Lialina and Arcángel Constantini; a number of exhibitions that involved sound, video and net.art like “nuevapropiedadcultural.html” and “CTRL+C / CTRL+V”; as well as a large group exhibition titled “Inconveniences are Temporal, Improvements are Permanent” which happened simultaneously with the renovation of the museum floor the show occupied. In 2002, he curated a group show at OPA (Oficina de Proyectos de Arte) in Guadalajara which was an essential part of the FITAC (Foro Internacional de Arte Contemporáneo) he had organized in Mexico City that same year. In 2008, he curated "The Title Of This Show Is A List That Includes The Dates In Which Each Of The Exhibited Works Were First Made, The Dates In Which Some Of Them Were Remade By The Artists And The Dates In Which They Were Last Shown" at Jan Mot, Brussels, which included works of Stephen Kaltenback, William Anastasi, Eduardo Costa and Dan Graham. The work of David Askevold, Alighiero Boetti, Luis Camnitzer, Barry Le Va and Francesc Torres was curated by García Torres in 2010 in an exhibition held at Elba Benitez in Madrid. Inhabiting a blurry space between curatorial work and his own work, during 2017 the artist presented “The Party Was Yesterday, and Nobody Remembers Anything” (La fiesta fue ayer y nadie recuerda nada) a presentation surrounding the early 1960s short-lived Museo Dinámico at Archivo; and an 8-hour film-marathon at the Massimo Cinema in Turin as part of his solo show at the Galleria Franco Noero. In 2020 he curated “The Last Tenant” an exhibition of both artworks and collectible design for MASA gallery in Mexico City.

== List of exhibitions ==
García Torres has exhibited his work in innumerable number of museums and biennales around the world, both in solo and collective exhibitions.

Individual exhibitions

- Stedelijk Museum, Amsterdam, Netherlands (2007)
- Kunsthalle Zürich, Zürich (2008)
- Wattis Institute for Contemporary Arts, San Francisco, United States (2009)
- Fundació Joan Miró, Barcelona, Spain (2009)
- Museo Nacional Centro de Arte Reina Sofía, Madrid, Spain (2010)
- Museo Madre, Naples, Italy (2013)
- Hammer Museum, Los Angeles (2014)
- Focus.: Mario Garcia Torres, Modern Art Museum of Fort Worth, Fort Worth, United States (2015)
- Walker Art Center, Minneapolis (2018)
- Wiels, Brussels (2019)
- Museo Jumex, Mexico City (2020)
- Museo de Arte Contemporáneo de Monterrey (2021)

Group exhibitions and biennials

- 52nd Venice Biennale, Venice, Italy (2007)
- Taipei Biennial, Taipei, Taiwan (2010)
- 29th São Paulo Art Biennial, São Paulo, Brazil (2010)
- dOCUMENTA (13), Kassel, Germany (2012)
- Mercosul Biennial, Porto Alegre, Brazil (2013)
- Berlin Biennale, Berlin, Germany (2014)
- Manifesta 11, Zurich (2016)
- Desert X, Palms Springs (2023)

== Public collections ==
- Museum of Modern Art, New York
- Musee d Art Moderne de la Ville de Paris, France
- Walker Art Center, Minneapolis
- Pompidou Center, France
- Guggenheim, New York
- Hammer Museum, Los Angeles
- Stedelijk Museum Amsterdam, The Netherlands
- Tate Modern, London, UK
- Museo Centro Nacional de Arte Reina Sofía, Madrid
- Museo Universitario de Arte Contemporáneo, Mexico City, Mexico
- Museo Rufino Tamayo, Mexico City, Mexico
- Museo Jumex, Mexico City, Mexico
- Colección FEMSA, Monterrey, Mexico
- Smithsonian Hirshhorn Museum and Sculpture Garden, Washington, D.C.

== Monographic publications ==
- Mario Garcia Torres. Illusion Brought Me Here. Edited by Vincenzo de Bellis and Caroline Dumalin with contributions from Sophie Berrebi, Julia Bryan-Wilson, Rulo David, Vincenzo de Bellis, Caroline Dumalin, and Tom McDonough. Published by Walker Art Center, Wiels, Koenig Books, London
- Mario García Torres: An Arrival Tale. Edited by Daniela Zyman and Cory Scozzari. Contributions by Armen Avanessian, Daniel Garza-Usabiaga, Carl Michael von Hausswolff, Anke Hennig, Chus Martínez, Eva Wilson, Daniela Zyman. Published by TBA21, Vienna and Sternberg Press
- Mario Garcia Torres. Caminar juntos (Let's Walk Together) Edited by Sofia Hernandez Chong Cuy with contributions by Luis Jorge Boone and Mario. Published by INBAL
- Mario Garcia Torres A Few Questions Regarding the Hesitance at Choosing Between Bringing a Bottle of Wine or a Bouquet of Flowers (100 Notes - 100 Thoughts). Published by Hatje Cantz
- Mario Garcia Torres Date Due. Published by Kadist.
