= Fernando Romero (company) =

Global architecture and industrial design firm

FR-EE Fernando Romero Enterprise
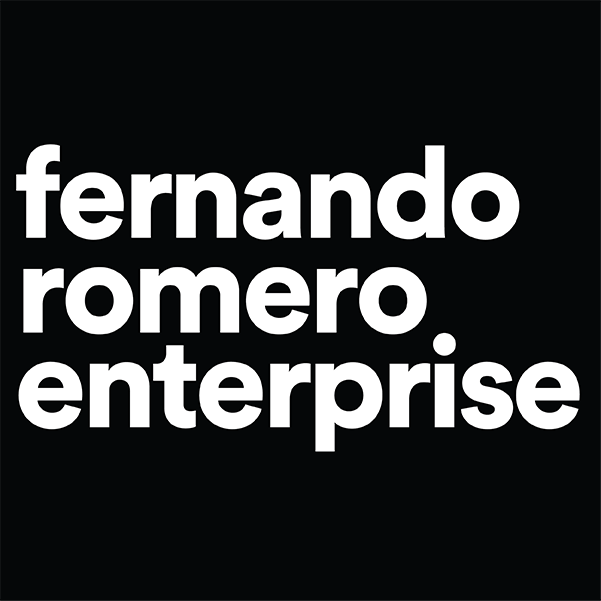
- Type: Architectural firm
- Industry: architecture, urbanism, interior design, landscape design, product design, research and development
- Founded: 2000
- Headquarters: Mexico City, New York City, Madrid & Shenzhen
- Key people: Fernando Romero (Founder and Director)
- Website: fr-ee.org

Fernando Romero is an architecture and industrial design firm founded by Fernando Romero with offices in New York, Mexico City, Madrid and Shenzhen.

== Notable projects ==
=== Museo Soumaya ===
Finished in 2011, the Museo Soumaya resembles a rotated trapezoid, supported by 28 curved steel columns, clad in 14,475 hexagonal aluminium plates of varying dimensions. It was conceptualized to reference the traditional, colonial ceramic-tiled building facades in Mexico City, and also change appearance depending on the weather, time of day and the viewer's vantage point. The museum was commissioned as a free gallery to display some of the 70,000 works of art owned by the Carlos Slim Foundation, the philanthropic foundation of Mexican billionaire Carlos Slim. It was one component in a larger redevelopment project, backed by Slim, of the Plaza Carso, an old industrial area of the city. This was the first major project undertaken by Romero, who was then married to Slim's daughter, Soumaya.

=== Bridging Teahouse ===
Completed in 2006, Bridging Teahouse is one of the 17 pavilions in Jinhua Architecture Park, an area designed in collaboration between Herzog & de Meuron and the Chinese Artist Ai Weiwei. According to Romero, the Teahouse was conceptualized to take two traditional pieces of Chinese architecture - the bridge and the teahouse - and reimagine them through contemporary architecture.

=== Los Cabos Convention Center ===
The Los Cabos convention center was designed to host the annual G20 Economic Summit in 2012. It has a capacity of up to 6,500 people.

=== Mexico New International Airport (NAIM) ===
Planned in collaboration with Foster and Partners, Mexico City's New International Airport was announced in September 2014, but shelved in late 2018, after a referendum was held on whether to continue construction. The plans were awarded the AEC Excellence in Infrastructure prize by Autodesk for the BIM Model in 2017, and in 2021 with Rethink the Future Award, in the category Concept and Transportation.

=== Hyperloop Altiplano ===
Fernando Romero was commissioned by Hyperloop One to design a Hyperloop public transportation system that connected Mexico City to the Bajío region, as well as cities such as Querétaro, León, and Guadalajara. Hyperloop One have since closed down.

== Publications ==
- Fernando Romero: FR-EE Architecture, 2019 by Rizzoli
- Simplexity, 2013 by Hatje Cantz
- FR-EE, 2013 by Mapas
- Fernando Romero: 2000 - 2010, 2009 by LAR/Fernando Romero
- Hyperborder, 2007 by Princeton Architectural Press
- ZMVM, 2000 by LAR

== Awards ==
- 2021: Rethink The Future Award but RTF for NAICM.
- 2020: Merit Award by CRED for Plaza Carso.
- 2017: World Changing Ideas Award by Fast Company
- 2015: American Institute of Architects, Honorary Fellowship
- 2015: Architizer A+ Award for Soumaya Museum
- 2013: Azure Magazine People's Choice Award for Soumaya Museum
- 2012: 50 Most Influential Designers by Fast Company
