= 2012 G20 Los Cabos summit =

Seventh meeting of the G20 heads of government

2012 G20 Los Cabos summit 7th G20 summit
- 18–19 June 2012
- The logo of the G20 Mexico 2012 summit
- Host country: Mexico
- Motto: Promoting Growth and Job
- Cities: San José del Cabo, Los Cabos
- Venues: Los Cabos Convention Center
- Participants: G20 member states Guest Invitees: Benin, Cambodia, Chile, Colombia, Ethiopia, Spain; Invited Organizations: Food and Agriculture Organization
- Chair: Felipe Calderón

The 2012 G20 Los Cabos Summit was the seventh meeting of the G20 heads of government/heads of state.

== Background ==
The final draft of G20 Toronto summit communique became the public announcement that the 2011 summit in France would be followed by a 2012 summit in Mexico.

== Preparations ==
Pre-planning for the summit began in 2010. In January, Mexican Deputy Foreign Minister Lourdes Aranda hosted a preliminary meeting in Mexico City. It was attended by "sherpas" (representatives) of the G20 foreign ministries.

The convention center was designed and constructed by Mexican architect Fernando Romero in a time span of seven months. It houses the largest green wall in the world, covering an area of 2,700 square meters.

== Agenda ==
Mexico believes the forum can better represent developing countries in both vision and policy. Under the leadership of President Felipe Calderón, Mexico will seek to expand the scope of the G20's development focus. Calderon also said of funding for the International Monetary Fund (IMF) that "it’s going to be the first time the fund is capitalized without the U.S., which reflects the importance of emerging markets." Brazilian Finance Minister Guido Mantega added that the BRICS countries were "going to make an additional contribution to the IMF that will be announced at the leaders’ meeting," in relation to similar amount announced by the group in April of about US$75 billion. European leaders were pressured by major economies to resolve the European sovereign-debt crisis after New Democracy won a plurality Greek legislative election in June.

== Attendance ==
The list below shows the leaders that have attended the 2012 G20 Leaders Summit.

State		Represented by	Title
(Argentina)	Argentina	Cristina Fernández de Kirchner	President
(Australia)	Australia	Julia Gillard	Prime Minister
(Brazil)	Brazil	Dilma Rousseff	President
(Canada)	Canada	Stephen Harper	Prime Minister
(China)	China	Hu Jintao	President
(France)	France	François Hollande	President
(Germany)	Germany	Angela Merkel	Chancellor
(India)	India	Manmohan Singh	Prime Minister
(Indonesia)	Indonesia	Susilo Bambang Yudhoyono	President
(Italy)	Italy	Mario Monti	Prime Minister
(Japan)	Japan	Yoshihiko Noda	Prime Minister
(Mexico)	Mexico	Felipe Calderón	President
(Russia)	Russia	Vladimir Putin	President
(Saudi Arabia)	Saudi Arabia	Ibrahim Abdulaziz Al-Assaf	Minister of Finance
(South Africa)	South Africa	Jacob Zuma	President
(South Korea)	South Korea	Lee Myung-bak	President
(Turkey)	Turkey	Recep Tayyip Erdoğan	Prime Minister
(United Kingdom)	United Kingdom	David Cameron	Prime Minister
(United States)	United States	Barack Obama	President
(European Union)	European Commission	José Manuel Barroso	President
(European Union)	European Council	Herman Van Rompuy	President
Invited states
State		Represented by	Title
(Benin)	Benin	Yayi Boni	President
(Cambodia)	Cambodia	Hun Sen	Prime Minister
(Chile)	Chile	Sebastián Piñera	President
(Colombia)	Colombia	Juan Manuel Santos	President
(Ethiopia)	Ethiopia	Meles Zenawi	Prime Minister
(Spain)	Spain	Mariano Rajoy	Prime Minister
International organisations
Organisation		Represented by	Title
	International Monetary Fund	Christine Lagarde	Managing Director
	Financial Stability Board	Mark Carney	Chairman
	Food and Agriculture Organization	José Graziano da Silva	Director-General
	International Labour Organization	Guy Ryder	Director-General
	Organisation for Economic Co-operation and Development	José Ángel Gurría	Secretary-General
	World Trade Organization	Pascal Lamy	Director-General
(United Nations)	United Nations	Ban Ki-moon	Secretary-General
	World Bank Group	Robert Zoellick	President

== Sideline meetings ==
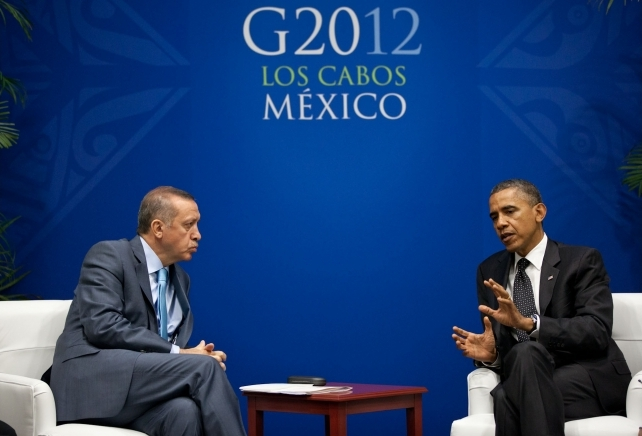
Turkish Prime Minister Recep Tayyip Erdogan talks with U.S. President Barack Obama on 19 June.

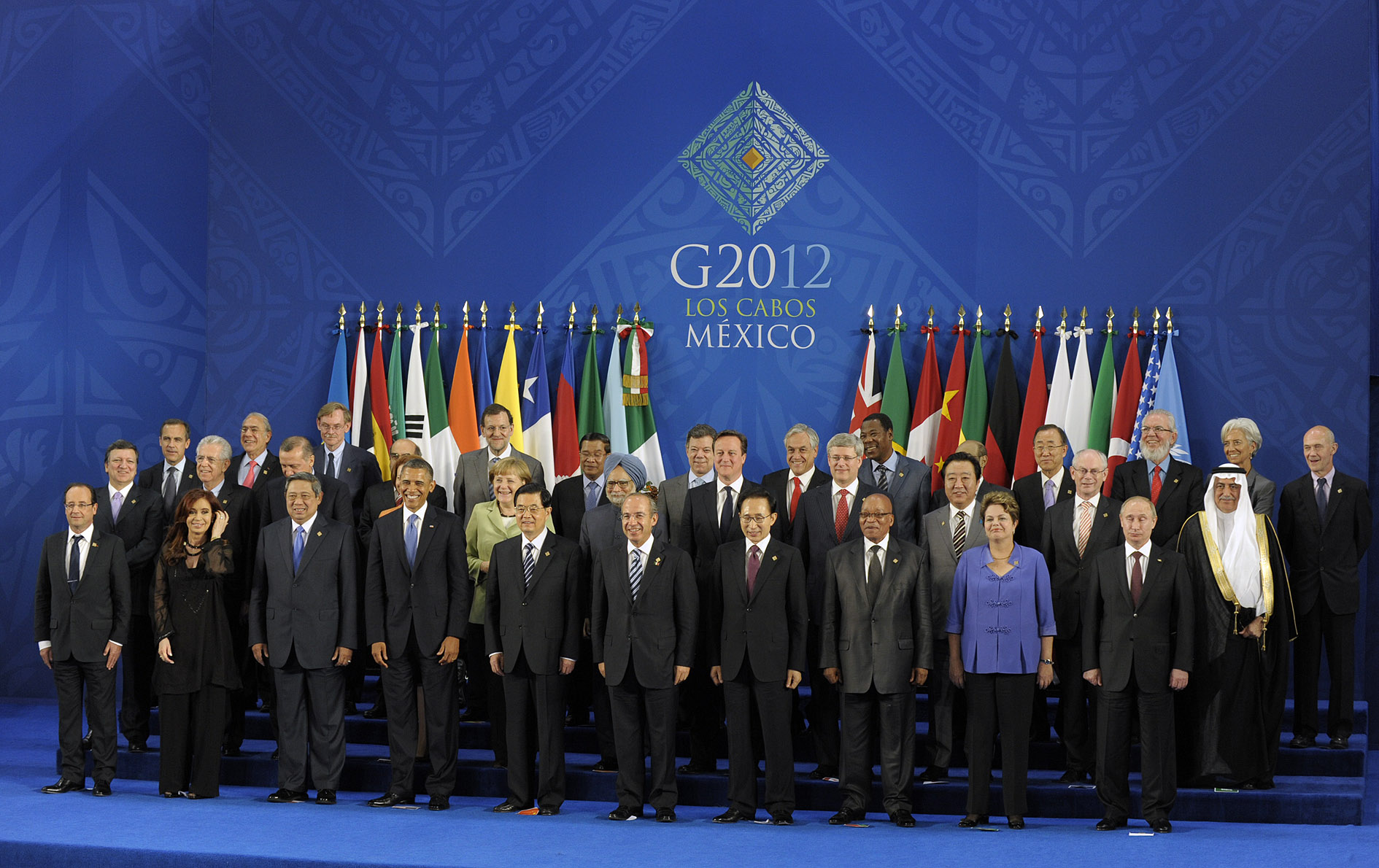
World leaders at the 2012 G20 Los Cabos summit.

U.S. President Barack Obama planned, first, a meeting with Russian President Vladimir Putin which was expected to run for one-and-a-half hours and cover "projected deployment of missile shield in Europe, prospects of peace settlement in Syria and bilateral ties [including the] Sergei Magnitsky Rule of Law Accountability Act". Obama and Putin made a joint statement about the Syrian uprising that read: "In order to stop the bloodshed in Syria, we call for an immediate cessation of all violence. We are united in the belief that the Syrian people should have the opportunity to independently and democratically choose their own future." It also followed Russia's intention to send two Russian warships, Nikolai Filchenkov and Tsezar Kunikov, with marines to its naval base in Tartus. As a result of the June Greek election, a bilateral meeting between German Chancellor Angela Merkel and the U.S. President Barack Obama on the situation in the eurozone was also planned.

10 Downing Street issued a statement that said British Prime Minister David Cameron had confronted Argentine President Cristina Fernández de Kirchner with a letter she had sent him in regards to the sovereignty of the Falkland Islands. She told him the issue should be resolved under the terms of United Nations General Assembly resolution 40/21 of November 1985. Cameron was reported to have said that "I am not proposing a full discussion now on the Falklands but I hope you have noted that they are holding a referendum and you should respect their views. We should believe in self determination and act as democrats here in the G20." The statement said that Cameron had confronted her "with vigour;" however, Argentine Foreign Minister Héctor Timerman said: "The president had the UN resolutions and she said to Cameron: 'Let's respect the United Nations'. The prime minister refused to accept the documents, turned his back and walked away without a farewell. After years of acting as a colonial power they have forgotten that they are responsible for the existence of colonialism, and that it is countries like Argentina that defeated most of the colonial projects in the world." The Prime Minister's Office later said that "we don't need an envelope from Fernandez to know what the UN resolutions say....All the UN resolutions do refer to the UN charter, which enshrines the principle of self-determination and that is what we are asking the Argentines to respect."

== The Convention Center ==
The Convention Center, located in Los Cabos, Mexico, was designed by the Mexican architect Fernando Romero. The distinctive element of the center is the green wall, the largest in the world, with an area of 2,700m^{2}

== See also ==
- 38th G8 summit
