= Fernando Romero (architect) =

Mexican architect (born 1971)

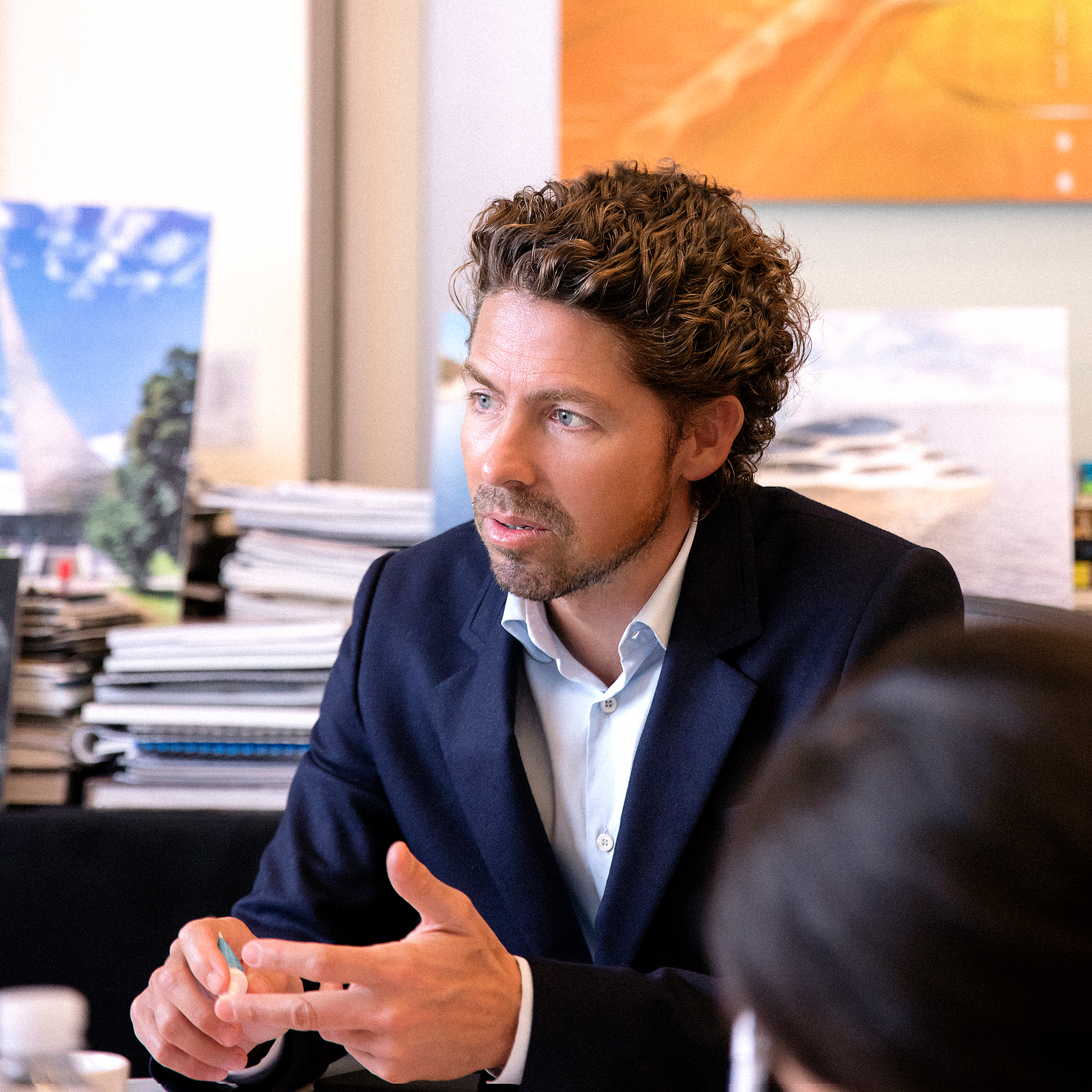
- Born: 1971 (age 54–55); Mexico City, Mexico
- Occupation: Architect
- Buildings: Soumaya Museum
- Projects: new Mexico City International Airport

Fernando Romero Havaux (born 1971) is a Mexican architect and philanthropist. He is the founder of Fernando Romero (formerly known as Fr-ee). In 2025, Fernando established Fundacion Fernando Romero and under its patronage is transforming Barragan's masterpiece – La Cuadra San Cristobal- into a new cultural venue for Mexico City. He is also the co-founder of Archivo Diseño y Arquitectura. Fernando is the ex-son-in-law of Mexican billionaire Carlos Slim.

== Family ==
Romero is the great-grandson of Alejandro Romero Lesbros, who was a pioneer in the development of several boroughs and recreation districts in Mexico City from the 1920s to the 1940s. His grandfather Raúl Romero Erazo and father Raúl Romero Zenizo continued the family business. He studied architecture at Universidad Iberoamericana in Mexico City from 1991 until 1995, serving as a president of the alumni society.

== Career ==
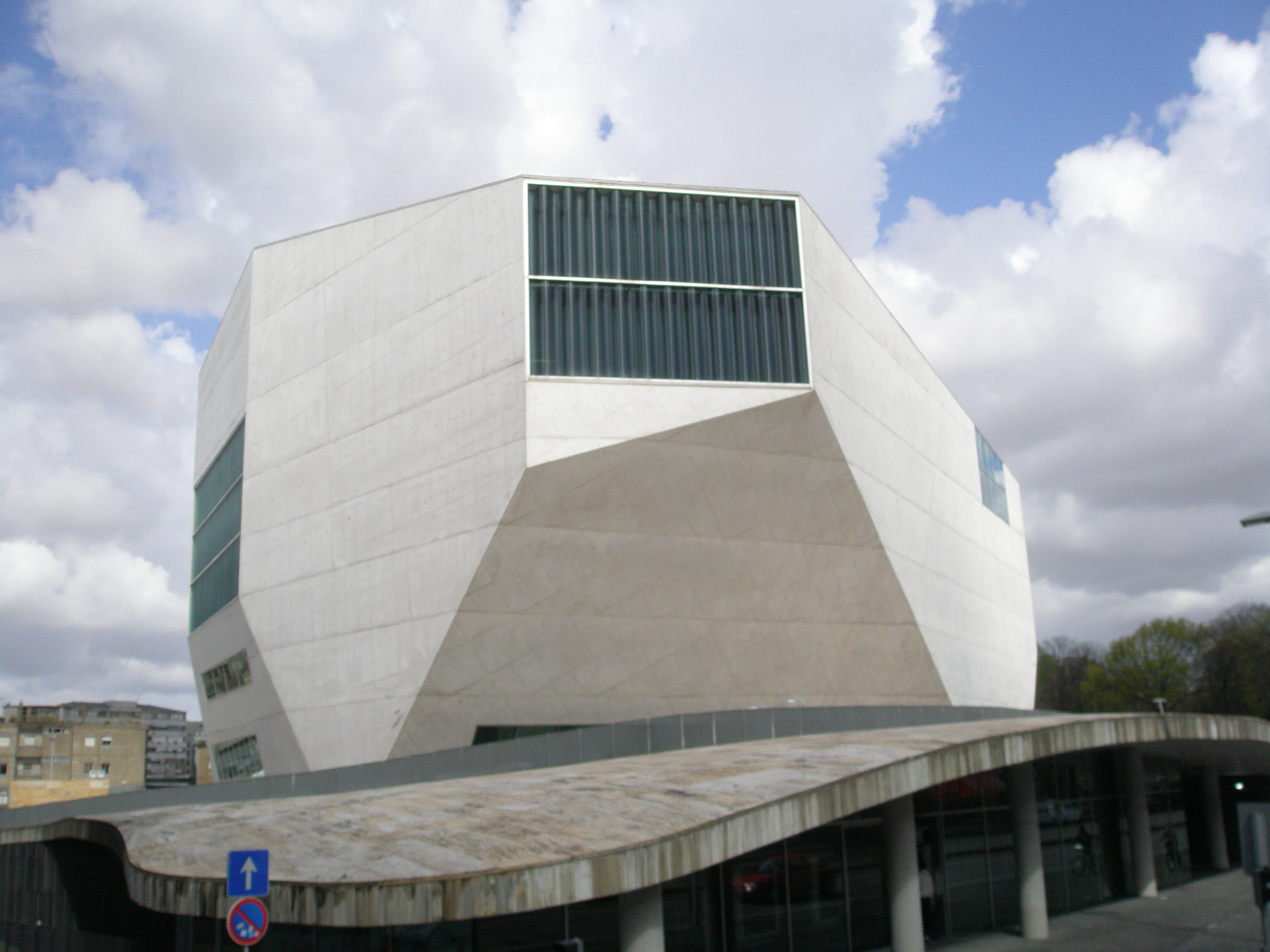
Casa da Musica

In 1995, following graduation, Romero joined the office of Rem Koolhaas, Office for Metropolitan Architecture (OMA), in Rotterdam, Netherlands. In 1999, Romero served as the project leader who won the entry for Casa da Música in Porto, Portugal. After its inauguration in 2005, The New York Times described the building as "one of the most important concert halls built in the last 100 years".

== Fernando Romero – Studio ==
After leaving OMA, Romero founded his own studio in Mexico City in 2000. Its work comprises a variety of scales, programs and morphologies located all over the world.

Romero designed the Soumaya Museum, the Mexico City International Airport (with Norman Foster) and El Salvador's Bitcoin City along with its Airport of the Pacific. In Spring 2025, his studio broke ground on a new $84 million hospital in Cabo San Lucas, Mexico for CHRISTUS HEALTH.

- BitCoin City, President Bukele, EL SALVADOR The Bitcoin City Of Salvador. Presented by President Bukele of El Salvador, designed by Architect Fernando Romero.Bitcoin city will be developed in the East of the country. Together with a new airport and a sea port, it will become the most ambitious regional development undertaken by El Salvador. This new city will mark the new moment of our civilisation. It will be a new urban planning with an environmental conscience due to Bitcoin City generating its own energy from the volcano located at the perimeter. This will show a new humanitarian city plan. The city will become a catalyst for investment by local and foreign businesses, who will become principal players in this new cycle of contemporary living.
- New Terminal Airport, President Bukele, El Salvador
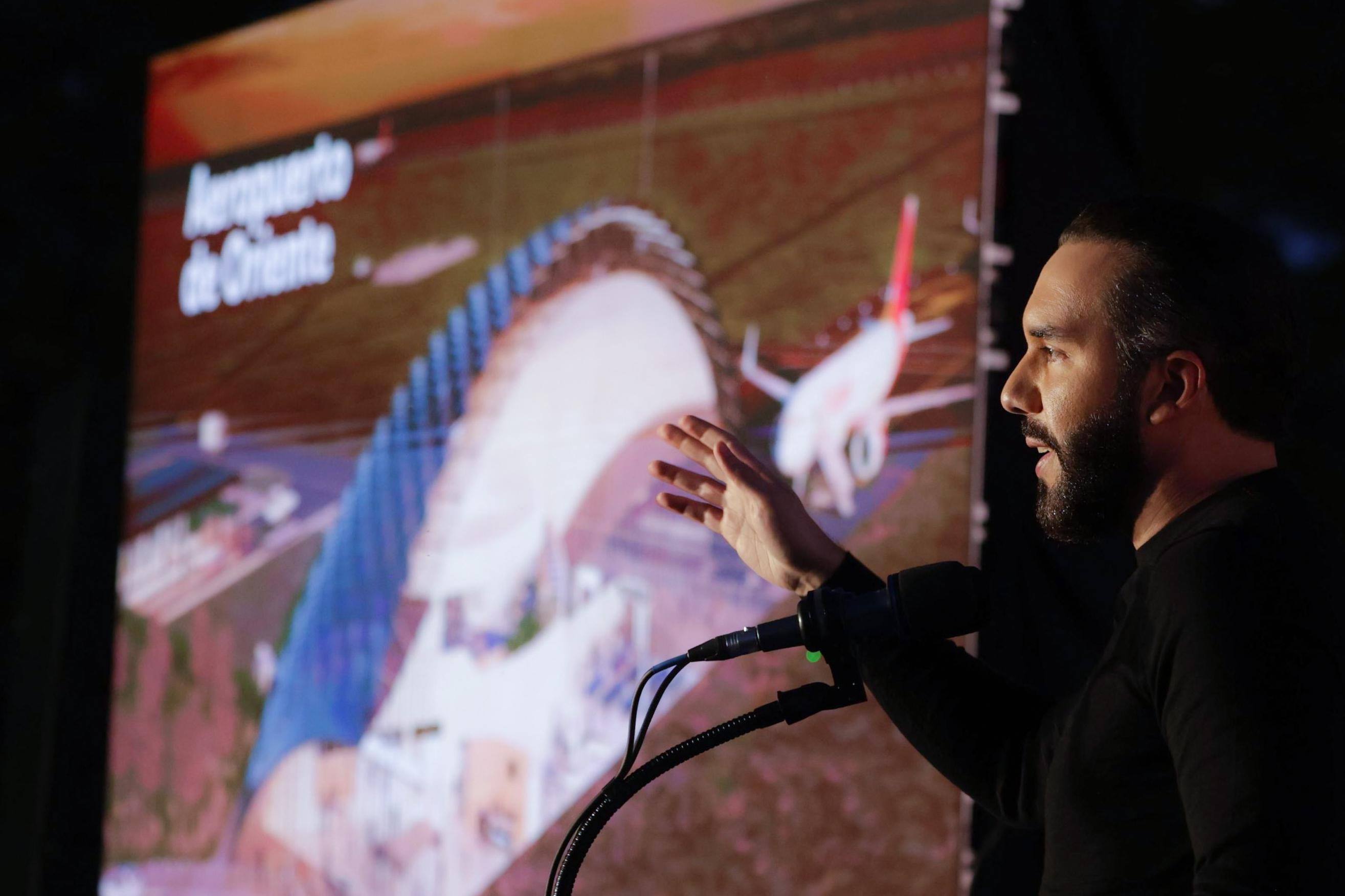
  Nayib Bukele with a render of the Airport of the Pacific
  President Nayib Bukele presided over the laying of the cornerstone of the Pacific Airport in the eastern part of the country in early 2025. Designed by Fernando Romero to serve as the initial gateway to Bitcoin City. With a capacity to handle 1 million passengers annually, the terminal combines efficient design with environmental responsibility. The terminal's defining architectural element is its geometric roof structure, composed of quadrangular pyramids that serve both practical and sustainable purposes
- SOUMAYA MUSEUM Home to Carlos Slim's remarkable collection of nearly 70,000 works, the Museo Soumaya in Mexico City's Plaza Carso is a cultural treasure showcasing art from the 15th century to the modern era, including one of the world's largest collections of Rodin sculptures. The museum's striking architectural form—an iconic, rotated rhomboid clad in over 16,000 hexagonal mirrored-steel tiles—reflects both its artistic contents and the dynamic environment of the city. Upon its opening the WSJ described it as "Billowing into the Mexico City skyline, Carlos Slim's Museo Soumaya is a civic gift and unrivaled masterworks trophy case.
- CHRISTUS HEALTH $84M HOSPITAL IN LOS CABOS In April 2025, CHRISTUS HEALTH, an international not-for-profit health system, broke ground on a new, state-of-the-art hospital in Cabo San Lucas, Mexico designed by Fernando Romero. The project will incorporate cultural elements, local materials and textures, as well as artistic installations that reflect the identity of Baja California Sur. Energy efficiency will be a priority through high-performance HVAC and lighting systems, along with the use of sustainable and eco-friendly materials. A double-skin facade wraps around the facility, with aluminum louvers that mitigate heat gain, preserve outward views, and withstand the corrosive coastal climate. Biophilic design principles are also applied throughout, including integrated greenery and framed views to reduce the clinical atmosphere often associated with healthcare spaces.
- New Mexico City international airport
  The proposed new Mexico City airport was designed in collaboration between fr·ee and Foster + Partners. This project was cancelled by the administration of Andrés Manuel López Obrador. It would have had an area of 743,000 square meters. Arup would have been the engineer on the project and performed original masterplan.

The terminal would have used very little power, and would have been the most sustainable airport in the world. It would have had short spaces throughout the halls; therefore, no internal trains or subway tunnels would be used. It would have had six lanes, and would have been able to mobilize up to 120 million passengers per year. It is estimated that the project would have required an investment of about 9,150 million dollars and is considered to be the most important work of the administration of the president Enrique Peña Nieto.

- G-20 Convention Center
  The Convention Center, located in Los Cabos, Mexico, was designed by fr·ee to host the 2012 G-20 Los Cabos summit. It has a capacity of 6,500 people and an area of 5,400 square meters. It is set for conferences, exhibitions, festivals and other events and was built in less than seven months. One of the features is the green wall found in its structure, which is the largest in the world with an area of 2,700 square meters.
- Eco Museum, Mexico City (2006–2007), described by Fernanda Canales in her book "Mexican architecture: 1900–2010" as a project that allows an association between the architecture with the general culture.
- General Offices Inbursa, Mexico City (2001–2003).
- Cervantes Tower: residential complex, Mexico City (2009–2010)
- Teahouse, Jinhua, China (2004–2006), considered a project that placed Mexican architecture within the architectural platform that seemed unattainable to Mexico a few years ago. The masterplan was designed by Herzog & de Meuron, and the initiative goes back to Chinese artist Ai Weiwei.
- Plaza Carso, Mexico City (2005–2017)

== Philanthropy ==
In February 2025, Romero founded Fundacion Fernando Romero which operates through the disciplines of art, architecture, and spatial research, all with the ambition of making a positive impact on people's lives. The work of the Fundación is organized under two umbrella initiatives —— Arts & Culture and a Research Institute.

=== La Cuadra ===
During Zona Maco 2025, Romero announced his foundation's plants to transform La Cuadra into a new, public cultural destination. Romero's vision includes the addition of new pavilions and other temporary interventions. Romero said "Through a range of programming, we aim to catalyze the power of architecture for the visiting public and celebrate the enduring cultural influence of Luis Barragán.”.

=== Marina Abramović at La Cuadra ===
As an early preview of the programming that his foundation will organize at La Caudra, Marina Abramović delivered the first annual artist experience during Zona Maco.

Romero is also the co-founder of Archivo Diseño y Arquitectura, located in Mexico City, a private collection and experimental exhibition space for industrial design objects.

== Lectures and public speaking ==
Romero has lectured extensively, most recently at the AIA Latin America: FAST FORWARD 2025 conference. He also served as a visiting professor at Columbia University in New York City. He is a member of the American Institute of Architects and CAMSAM (Mexican Chamber of Architects).

== Recognition ==
Romero has been awarded with numerous international and national distinctions, such as:

- Honorary Fellowship (2015) by American Institute of Architects;
- Americas Property Award (2012);
- 50 Creative Pioneers in (2012) by Fast Company;
- 2004 Bauhaus international award in Germany.

== Books ==
Books by Romero:

- FR-EE, Mapas (Mexico City, 2013)
- You Are The Context (New York, 2012)
- Simplexity, Hatje Cantz (Germany, 2010)
- Hyperborder, Princeton Architectural Press (New York, 2007): A research into one of the most active borders in the world: Mexico-USA
- The Air Is Blue (Mexico City, 2007): In homage to Luis Barragán, an exposition curated by Hans Ulrich Obrist and Pedro Reyes (Artist), with 30 contemporary artists
- Translation, ACTAR Editorial (Barcelona, 2005)
- ZMVM (Mexico City, 2000): An analysis of Mexico City's urban transformation
