= Christoph Draeger =

Swiss multimedia artist

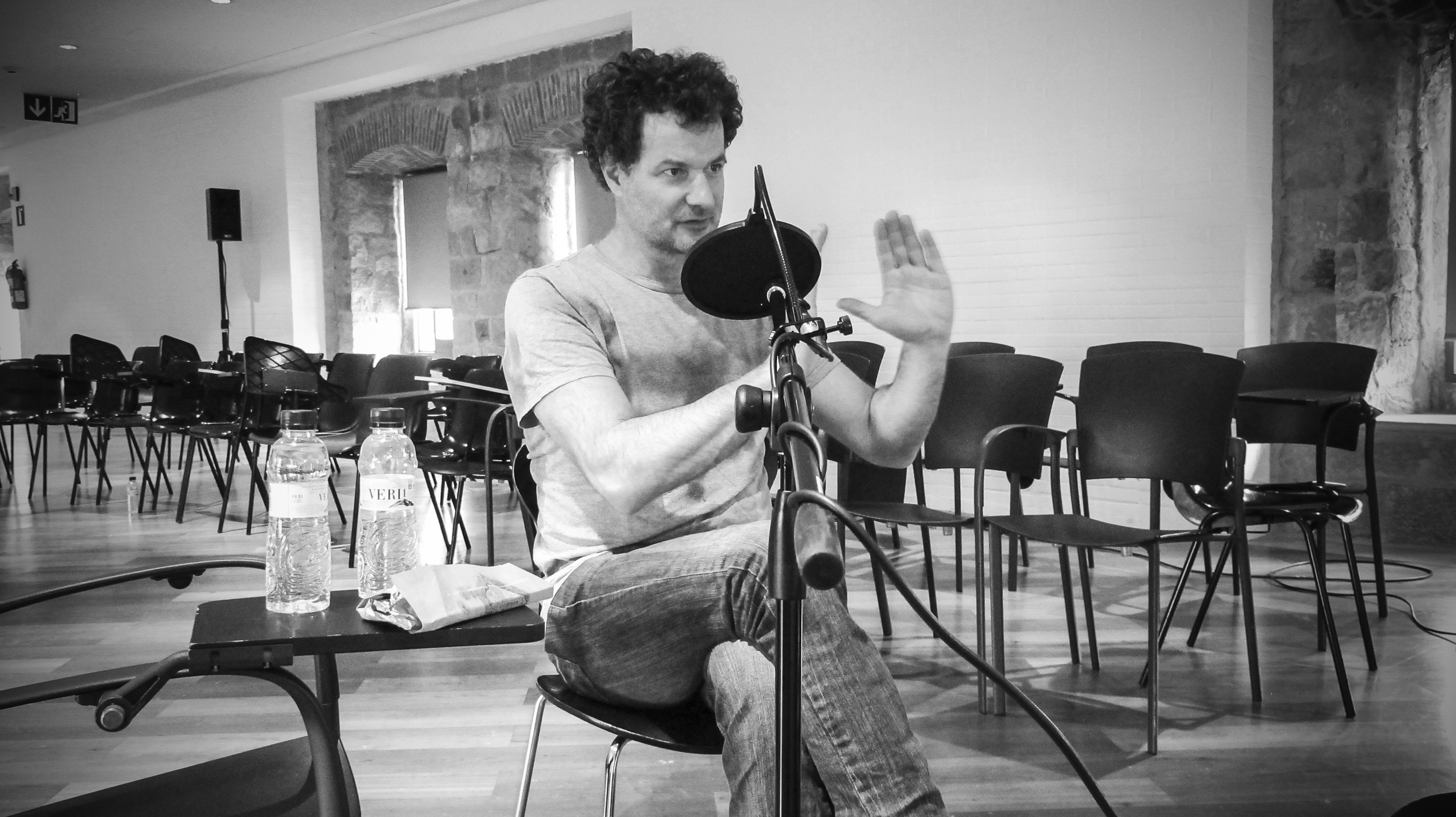
Christoph Draeger

Christoph Draeger (born 1965) is a Swiss multimedia artist. Born in Zürich, he currently lives and works in Berlin, Germany.

== Life and career ==
Christoph Draeger was born in 1965 in Zürich, Switzerland. From 1986 until 1990, he attended the School of Visual Arts in Lucerne, Switzerland, and from 1990 until 1991 he studied at École Nationale Supérieure des Arts Visuels de la Cambre in Brussels, Belgium. In Brussels, he co-founded the artist-run space Etablissements d'en Face together with Alec DeBuschere.

After four years in Brussels, in 1996, Christoph Draeger moved to New York where he won a one-year scholarship at P.S.1's International Studio Program. There, he met his future partner, Austrian artist Heidrun Holzfeind. They stayed in New York until moving to Vienna in 2011 with their two year old son, Jakob.

From 2015-2020, the family moved to Umea, Sweden, where Christoph Draeger was holding a full professorship at Umea Academy of Fine Arts.

From 2022-2025, Christoph Draeger taught artistic practice at Yale-NUS, National University of Singapore.

His works have been exhibited worldwide in galleries and institutions such as the Centre Georges Pompidou in Paris, Kunst-Werke Institute for Contemporary Art in Berlin, Whitney Museum of American Art in New York, Massachusetts Museum of Contemporary Art, and Santiago Museum of Contemporary Art. Draeger has also taken part in several important art events, Venice Biennale and Art Cologne among others. His works are in many private and institutional collections such as the Centre Georges Pompidou in Paris, Kunsthaus Zürich, and the Whitney Museum of American Art and Brooklyn Museum in New York.

He sometimes works together with his partner, Austrian artist Heidrun Holzfeind, who specialises in documentaries and photography. Together with their son, Jakob, then three years old, Draeger recreated fragments from the Hollywood movie The Road (2009) for his work The Rd. (2013).

== Artistic practice and interests ==
In his artistic practice, Draeger relies mainly on installation, photography and video, in which he uses both archival and self-made footage. He also occasionally explores the medium of sculpture and practices performance art. As Draeger's interests revolve around media-saturated culture and people's struggle with disasters, most of his works focus on catastrophes and media representations of tragic events.

== Works ==
Selected works by Christoph Draeger.

=== Voyages Apocaliptiques ===
Voyages Apocaliptiques (from 1994) is a long-term photographic project, which began in 1994 and is still in progress. The cycle is dedicated to the elusiveness of memory in a broad sense. It comprises so far around 100 photos taken by Draeger of places affected by some kind of catastrophe, including photographs of areas that look like nothing tragic have ever happened there, and of places permanently marked with those events or still coping with their effects.

=== The Last News ===
The video installation The Last News (2002) by Draeger and American artist Reynold Reynolds is a coverage of the end of the world. It is a reaction to media response to the events of 9/11, mocking and exaggerating the way in which tragic events are presented in mass-media, but also commenting on the process of transmission and reception of information and its reliability faced with commercial sensationalism.

=== Black September ===
The video installation Black September (2002) is a video reconstruction of the events from the XXth Olympiad in Munich in 1972 when eleven members of the Israeli Olympic team were abducted by Palestinian terrorists. It was one of the first events of this kind in which media had such profound impact on the situation; the terrorists planned their next steps on the basis of information they had heard on the television. Draeger's installation also includes excerpts from the authentic TV coverage, set in a reconstructed hotel room where the events occurred.

=== Helenés ===
The title of the video Helenés (2005) originated as a result of Draeger's reading mistake - the original material, a film showing dramatised nuclear protection exercises from the Cold War era, was actually named Jelenés. The 16mm film roll was found by the artist in the storage room of a disaster prevention camp in Hungary. The thing that struck Draeger the most in the original film was its monotonous narration in Hungarian, which he decided to subtitle with George W. Bush's second term inaugural address. By relating the presidential speech to the Cold War discourse, the artist emphasizes the durability of the American ideological project, positing a special role of the United States and a necessity for its hegemony.

=== Tsunami Architecture ===
Tsunami Architecture (2012) by Christoph Draeger and Heidrun Holzfeind is a project composed of a book and a video. It follows the effects of the 2004 Indian Ocean tsunami, one of the worst natural catastrophes in history. Draeger and Holzfeind say about this project: "We were interested in how the flood of aid money has transformed the affected regions, rebuilt and refashioned local economies and shaped communities. How does collective and individual memory work, years after such highly publicized media event? How has architecture built after the tsunami been able to respond to the individual needs of affected communities? How were these communities able to participate in the recovery process? How have these structures been adapted over time by their inhabitants, and how did architectural interventions alter societal and communal structures?"

== Awards, grants & residencies ==
List of selected Draeger's awards, scholarships and residencies.

- 2015 Pro Helvetia Residency in Delhi, India
- 2014-2025: MAK Residency in Los Angeles
- 2008: Pro Helvetia Residency in Cairo, Egypt
- 2007: Residency at CCA, Center for Contemporary Art Ujazdowski Castle, Warsaw
- 2006: Residency at Springhill Institute, Birmingham
- 2006-2007: Residency of the Landis+Gyr Foundation, London
- 2005-2005: Residency in Mexico City
- 2005/2008/2013: Grant (Werkjahr) of the canton of Zürich
- 2004: Grant (Werkjahr) of the City of Zürich
- 2003: Grant Steo Foundation, Küssnacht
- 2002: Residency at Headlands Center for the Arts, Sausalito; California
- 2002: Residency at Faxinal des Artes, Parana, Brazil
- 1997: Promotion Grant of the Grisons government
- 1996-1997: Residency at International Studio Program, P.S.1, Institute for Contemporary Art, New York
- 1994 and 1995: Kiefer-Hablitzel Award
- 1994: Swiss National Art Award
- 1991: Grant of the Landis+Gyr Foundation

== Exhibitions ==
List of selected solo exhibitions.

- KLET- Centre of Conceptual Art, Landskrona, Sweden, 2025
- Aceh Tsunami Museum, Banda Aceh, Indonesia, 2025 (with Heidrun Holzfeind)
- The Auroville Project, ARTES, Porto, Portugal (with Heidrun Holzfeind)
- The Near Future, Konsthall Kåddis, Umeå, 2020
- From Within and From Without-The Auroville Project, Kunstpavillon Innsbruck, Austria, 2017 (with Heidrun Holzfeind)
- Tsunami Architecture, X and Beyond, Copenhagen, 2016 (with Heidrun Holzfeind)
- Young Projects, Los Angeles (USA), 2015
- Unforced Errors, Lokal 30, Warsaw, 2014
- Zero, Kunstzeughaus Rapperswil, Switzerland, 2013
- The Christoph Project, Kunstraum Pro Arte, Hallein, Austria, 2013
- Tsunami Architecture, OK Centrum for Contemporary Art, Linz, 2012 (with Heidrun Holzfeind)
- A drift, Kunsthalle Arbon, 2012
- Temporary Wall of Voodoo, West Gallery, Den Hague, 2011
- Apocalipso Place (with Reynold Reynolds), Lokal_30, Warsaw, 2011
- Breaking The Wave, Y Gallery, New York, 2011
- Monumental, Y Gallery, Bowery, New York, 2010
- Tropolicalia, Centre for Contemporary Art Ujazdowski Castle, Warsaw, 2009
- The End of the Remake, Roebling Hall, New York, 2008
- Music Is the Healing Force of the Universe, Catharine Clark Gallery, San Francisco, 2008
- Helenés Rising, Living Room, Cologne, 2007
- Old works, Galerie Anne de Villepoix, Paris, 2006
- Munich, Susanne Vielmetter Projects, Los Angeles, 2005
- The Brazil Project, Roebling Hall, New York, 2005
- New Landscapes, Catharine Clark Gallery, San Francisco, 2004
- Memories of Terror From a Safe Distance, Kunstmuseum Solothurn, 2003
- Beaufort 12, Expo 02, Arteplage, Neuchatel, Switzerland
- The Last Rider, Kunsthalle Fri-Art, Fribourg, Switzerland
- Black September, mullerdechiara gallery, Berlin, 2002
- If You Lived Here You Would Be Dead Now, Roebling Hall, New York, 2001
- Inundacions, CCCB, Centre de Cultura Contemporània, Barcelona, 2000
- Voyages, Galerie Urs Meile Luzern, Switzerland, 2000
- Going All The Way, Kunstforum Baloise, Basel, Switzerland, 2000
- Teenage Riot, Halle für Kunst e.V., Lüneburg, Germany, 2000
- Natural Born Killer, Le Parvis, Centre d’Art Contemporain,Ibos-Tarbes, 2000
- Crash, Centre d’Art Contemporain, Pau, France, 2000
- St. Gervais, Centre pour l’image contemporaine, Geneva, 2000
- Apocalypso Place/Fall Season, Kunsthaus, Zurich (with Reynold Reynolds), 2000
- Apocalypso Place (with Reynold Reynolds), Liebman Magnan Gallery, New York, 1999
- Lakehurst NJ, Zeppelinmuseum, Friedrichshafen, Germany, 1999
- Yellow and Red, Institute for Contemporary Art, Dunauvarnos, Hungary (with Martin Frei), 1999
- Out of the Blue-Into the Black, Damasquine Gallery, Brussels,1999
- KomMerzbau, ©usa-united swiss artists, Galerie Bernhard Schindler, Bern (with Martin Frei),1999
- New York-Serneus Retour, Kulturhaus Rosengarten, Gruesch, 1998
- OEL, Galerie Urs Meile, Luzern, Switzerland
- NB, Kunsthalle, St.Gallen, Switzerland
- Heidji, ©usa-united swiss artists, Luciano Fascati Galerie, Chur (with Martin Frei)
- Hotelbrand, Hotel, Zürich, Switzerland
- Nature abhors a naked singularity: Paddy Jolley, Nin Bruderman and Christoph Draeger, P.S.1. Clocktower Gallery, New York, 1997
- How Far You Are, Passage Placette, Belluard Fribourg, Switzerland , 1996
- It's the end of the world as we love it, Shed im Eisenwerk, Frauenfeld, 1996
- M.U.S.E.U.M., Kunstmuseum Luzerne, Switzerland (with ©usa-united swiss artists), 1994
- Schleutelwerken, Galerie Fons Welters, Amsterdam, 1994
- Critical Distance, ADO Gallery, Antwerp, Belgium, 1993
- SOLO, Etablissements d'en Face, Brussels, 1991
