= 1958 in art =

Events from the year 1958 in art.

== Awards ==
- Archibald Prize: William Edwin Pidgeon – Mr Ray Walker
- Royal Architectural Institute of Canada Allied Arts Medal – Louis Archambault

== Events ==
- April 29 – Alley of Classics, Chișinău, opened in Romania.
- October 15 – At the Goldschmidt sale at Sotheby's in London, a version of Paul Cézanne's The Boy in the Red Vest sells at a new record price for a painting at auction.
- M. C. Escher publishes his illustrated book The Regular Division of the Plane
- Robert Frank publishes his photographic essay The Americans (in Paris)
- Mark Rothko completes forty paintings, the "Seagram murals" (including Black on Maroon and Four Darks in Red), for The Four Seasons Restaurant in New York but withdraws from the commission before they are hung there

== Exhibitions ==
- Jean Arp retrospective at the Museum of Modern Art, New York City
- Yves Klein, La spécialisation de la sensibilité à l’état matière première en sensibilité picturale stabilisée, Le Vide ("The Specialization of Sensibility in the Raw Material State into Stabilized Pictorial Sensibility, The Void"), Iris Clert Gallery, Paris.
- Constructivist Design at the Galerie Lambert Weyl, Paris

== Works ==
- Edmond Amateis – Polio Hall of Fame in Warm Springs, Georgia
- Zdzisław Beksiński – Untitled
- Paul Cadmus – Night in Bologna
- Salvador Dalí - Meditative Rose
- Willem de Kooning - Yellow River
- Jacob Epstein – sculptures
  - Bust of Edward Sydney Woods, Bishop of Lichfield in Lichfield Cathedral
  - St Michael's Victory over the Devil for Coventry Cathedral
  - Trades Union Congress war memorial in Congress House, London
- M. C. Escher – Belvedere (lithograph)
- Marshall Fredericks – The Spirit of Detroit (bronze)
- Mathias Goeritz, Luis Barragán and Jesús Reyes Ferreira – Torres de Satélite, monument in Ciudad Satélite, Mexico
- Richard Hunt - Hero Construction
- Jasper Johns – Three Flags
- Morris Louis – Russet
- René Magritte – The Listening Room (second version)
- S. H. Raza – Paysage
- Mark Rothko
  - Black on Maroon
  - Untitled (Black on Maroon)'
- Emil Schumacher – Cadmium
- David Wynne – Teamwork (sculpture)

== Births ==
- 27 January – Kadri Mälk, Estonian artist and jewelry designer
- 27 February – Max Crivello, Italian artist
- 27 March – Peter Howson, Scottish figurative painter, war artist
- 4 May – Keith Haring, American artist and social activist (d.1990).
- 8 September – Reiko Terashima, Japanese manga artist and illustrator.
- 23 October – Axel Krause, German painter and graphic artist.
- 5 December – Julio Galán, Mexican artist (d.2006).
- date unknown
  - Helena Klakocar, Dutch cartoonist
  - Doris Salcedo, Colombian visual artist and sculptor
  - Yoshiteru Otani, Japanese cartoonist
  - Adrian Wiszniewski, Scottish figurative painter

== Deaths ==
- January 28 – Ferenc Helbing, Hungarian painter and lithographer (b. 1870)
- January 30 – Jean Crotti, Swiss-born painter (b. 1878)
- February 13 – Georges Rouault, French Fauvist and Expressionist painter and stained glass artist (b. 1871)
- February 16 – Situ Qiao, Chinese painter (b. 1902)
- February 26 – Yokoyama Taikan, Japanese painter (b. 1868)
- March 1 – Giacomo Balla, Italian painter (b. 1871)
- March 22 – Claire McCardell, American fashion designer (b. 1905)
- April 11 – Konstantin Yuon, Russian painter and theatre designer (b. 1875)
- May 11 – Lucien Lelong, French fashion designer (b. 1889)
- August 12 – André Bauchant, French naïve painter (b. 1873)
- August 22 – Ted Sears, American animator (b. 1900)
- August 23 – Marlow Moss, English Constructivist artist (b. 1889)
- August 24 – Paul Henry, Irish painter (b. 1876)
- September 15 – Stephen Bone, English painter (b. 1904)
- October 11
  - Maurice de Vlaminck, French Fauvist painter (b. 1876)
  - Max Jakob Friedländer, German-born curator and art historian (b. 1867)
- November 17 – Frank Cadogan Cowper, English painter and illustrator (b. 1877)
- November 30 – Sir Hubert Wilkins, Australian explorer and photographer (b. 1888)
- date unknown
  - Viktor Jansson, Finnish sculptor (b. 1886)
  - Sybil Pye, English bookbinder (b. 1879)

== See also ==
- 1958 in Fine Arts of the Soviet Union
