= Voids, Echoes and Whispers =

Voids, Echoes And Whispers

Studio album by Marzio Scholten
- Released: April 2012 (NL) (CD)
- Recorded: Fattoria Musica Recording Studios, Osnabrück, Germany on August 14 and 15, 2011
- Genre: Jazz
- Length: 52:39 (CD)
- Label: Self Produced
- Producer: Marzio Scholten

Professional ratings
Review scores
Source	Rating
All About Jazz	
Tokyo Jazz Notes	
Parool	4 stars
Telegraaf	
Jazzenzo – Jazz Magazine	
Jazzflits – Jazz Magazine	

Voids, Echoes And Whispers is a self-produced album by Marzio Scholten which was released on April 19, 2012.

Excerpt from the album review by the influential jazz music website All About Jazz: "For his third release, Marzio Scholten capitalizes on the unexpectedly impressive ... World of Thought (OAP, 2010). ... If there's a single strength amongst Voids, Echoes And Whispers' many, it's Scholten's growing maturity as a writer and performer."

Tokyo Jazz Notes published an excellent review of the album and its readers selected Voids, Echoes And Whispers as runner up in the category 'Best International Jazz Album' of 2012. The opening track of the album, "The King Is Dead (Long Live The King)", received an honorable mention in the 2011 International Songwriting Competition in the category 'Jazz'.

== Track listing ==
1. The King Is Dead (Long Live The King) – 7:10
2. Voids, Echoes and Whispers – 8:42
3. A Million Ways of Thinking – 9:03
4. Air – 9:51
5. Oxygen (Interlude) – 1:00
6. Optimus Prime – 7:18
7. The Murals of Seagram – 11:08
8. Path to Nirvana – 3:46
9. Revolution Is Everywhere – 4:44

All compositions by Marzio Scholten

== Personnel ==
- Marzio Scholten – Guitar
- Yaniv Nachum – Tenor Saxophone
- Randal Corsen – Piano
- Stefan Lievestro – Double Bass
- Mark Schilders – Drums
