= The Comfort Women: Historical, Political, Legal and Moral Perspectives =

2014 book by Naoko Kumagai

The Comfort Women: Historical, Political, Legal and Moral Perspectives is a 2014 book by Naoko Kumagai, a professor of international relations at Aoyama Gakuin University. It deals with the comfort women issue, including the part played by the Japanese military, Japan's postwar apologies and compensation, the Asian Women's Fund, and the effect of the issue on Japan–South Korea relations.

The original Japanese edition, Ianfu mondai (慰安婦問題), was published by Chikuma Shobō. An English translation by David Noble was published in 2016 by the International House of Japan as part of the LTCB International Library Selection.

== Contents ==
Kumagai looks at the Japanese military's involvement in the comfort stations. She treats this as a different question from whether Japanese authorities directly forced women into service. The book sets out the various accounts of how women were recruited and how much force was used.

Later chapters cover Japan's responsibility for what happened, the apologies made by Japanese governments, compensation, and the Asian Women's Fund. Kumagai also discusses the legal and moral side of historical redress and how ideas about women's rights have changed over time.

The last part of the book is about nationalism, memories of colonial rule, and why Japan and South Korea see the past so differently. Kumagai argues that the issue should be approached through the human rights of the individual women.

== Author ==
Kumagai studied international relations at Tsuda College and has a master's degree from International Christian University. She received her PhD in political science from the City University of New York.

She taught at the International University of Japan before moving to Aoyama Gakuin University's School of Global Studies and Collaboration, where she has been a professor since 2020. Her work deals mainly with conflict resolution, reconciliation, human rights, postwar compensation, and relations between Japan and South Korea.

== Reception ==
Hugh Cortazzi, a former British ambassador to Japan, reviewed the book for The Japan Society Review. He called it a "valuable contribution" and said it dealt fairly with the different points of view. He also said it did not really explain why the issue only became a major political dispute in the early 1990s.

Bob Tadashi Wakabayashi, a historian and professor emeritus at York University, said the book was wide-ranging and concise and treated opposing views with respect. He thought it would be useful for both scholars and general readers, and he praised Noble's translation. He noted that the book is based mainly on theoretical and secondary literature.
