= I-House =

The I-house is a vernacular house type popular in the American colonial period.

It may also refer to:

- A brand of manufactured houses by Clayton Homes
- The International House of Japan
- The International House of New York
