= The Breakfast Table (Brack) =

Painting by John Brack

- Artist: John Brack
- Year: 1958
- Medium: oil on canvas
- Dimensions: 122.2 cm × 68.7 cm (48.1 in × 27.0 in)
- Location: Art Gallery of New South Wales; Sydney

The Breakfast Table is a 1958 still life painting by Australian artist John Brack. The painting depicts a table after breakfast but before the plates, cups and cutlery have been cleared.

Breakfast has finished and the participants have gone, although the detective-like artist has set out visual clues that tell us about the people who were here. To begin with Brack himself, his painter-wife, and their four daughters are signified by a glass, a tea cup and four mugs. Of course, all these vessels are empty, much like the egg shell in its cup, and the five plates dotted with a few crumbs left from toast. Even bottles are drained of liquids. Not a scrap of food remains. No crusts, no dabs of butter, no unconsumed dregs of milk.

— Dr Christopher Heathcote,

The viewpoint of the artist is from over the table, laying out the objects in a geometrical pattern with tubular bottles and jars, flat plates, and knives tilted at different angles. The painting foreshadows some of Brack's later work—his 1960s still lifes portraying knives and his allegorical conflict paintings of the 1980s.

The work was gifted to Trinity College, Melbourne in 1958 in memory of recently deceased alumnus Edward Rowden White (1881-1958) by members of his family, having been purchased from Brack's exhibition that year. It remained with the college until, with the consent of the family, they engaged Joseph Brown to take it to auction in 1989. Having sold, it returned to the secondary market a little over a year later where it was acquired for the Grundy collection. The Art Gallery of New South Wales acquired the work at auction in 2013 for A$1.3 million.
