= Black on Maroon =

Painting by Mark Rothko

- Artist: Mark Rothko
- Year: 1958
- Type: Oil paint, acrylic paint, glue tempera and pigment on canvas
- Dimensions: 266.7 cm × 381.2 cm (105 in × 150 in)
- Location: Tate Modern; London

Black on Maroon is a mixed media painting by Mark Rothko, created in 1958. It is housed at the Tate Modern, in London.

== Composition ==
The painting comes from a series of three canvases painted by Rothko in 1958–59, produced in the Seagram murals commission for The Four Seasons Restaurant, in New York's Seagram Building on Park Avenue.

Rothko's original conception for the work became increasingly sombre. He later said, "After I had been at work for some time I realised that I was much influenced subconsciously by Michelangelo's walls in the staircase room of the Medicean Library in Florence. He achieved just the kind of feeling I'm after ..."

The murals were eventually withheld from installation at the restaurant, reportedly because Rothko did not think it was an appropriate setting for the works. In 1965 he suggested making them a gift to the Tate Gallery; this was finalised in 1969. On the day of their delivery in 1970, Rothko was found dead in his studio.

== Related defacement ==
On 7 October 2012 another work from the same series, also titled Black on Maroon, was defaced with writing in black paint. The perpetrator told the BBC "I'm not a vandal" and compared himself with surrealist artist Marcel Duchamp, adding "Art allows us to take what someone's done and put a new message on it." It was later revealed that the man was Polish national Vladimir Umanets. His addition to the painting had included his name and the number 12, followed by the sentence: "a potential piece of yellowism". The following day Umanets was arrested on suspicion of causing criminal damage. During the trial, prosecutor Gregor McKinley said the repair would cost £200,000.

On 13 December 2012 Umanets was sentenced at Inner London Crown Court to two years in jail. Judge Roger Chapple told him that his actions had been "entirely deliberate, planned and intentional". Talking about "yellowism" Judge Chapple added that it was "wholly and utterly unacceptable to promote it by damaging a work of art" which he called a "gift to the nation".

The BBC's Arts Editor Will Gompertz explained that the ink from Umanets's marker caused "a deep wound, not a superficial graze", and that the vandal had caused "significant damage". In order to work out how best to restore the painting conservators created a replica of the damaged work and tested various solvents. It was estimated that restoration of the painting might take up to 18 months to complete, as the many layers applied by Rothko would have to be replicated individually. In May 2014 the restored painting was returned to public display and Umanets offered a public apology, saying: "I apologise to [the] British people for what I did. I suppose I wanted to change the art world but of course I did it in a very, very wrong way. I spent almost a year and a half in prison and the British people have paid huge restoration costs, so it definitely wasn't worth doing it, and I'm sure the restoration team has done a wonderful job and I encourage everyone to see the restored picture."
