= Garage Moi =

Studio album by Marzio Scholten
- Released: October 2013 (NL) (CD)
- Recorded: by Kasper Frenkel at Electric Monkey, Amsterdam, on 6 and 7 June 2013
- Genre: Jazz
- Length: 48:34 (CD)
- Label: Self Produced
- Producer: Marzio Scholten

Professional ratings
Review scores
Source	Rating
Parool	5 stars

Garage Moi is a self-produced album by Marzio Scholten's IDENTIKIT which was released on 29 October 2013.

Dutch newspaper Het Parool was the first to review this album on 17 October 2013 and rated it with five (*****) stars, the maximum rating. One of their quotes in the review: "This isn't jazz, this is universal art.”

== Track listing ==
1. Contragramma – 5:24
2. Garage Moi – 2:52
3. Heisenberg – 7:00
4. The Great Race – 6:10
5. Fire and Snow – 8:14
6. We Are All Bankers – 4:31
7. The Architect – 5:05
8. The Architect II – 5:47
9. The Architect III – 3:31

All compositions by Marzio Scholten

== Personnel ==
- Marzio Scholten – Guitar
- Lars Dietrich – Alto Sax
- Jasper Blom – Tenor Sax
- Sean Fasciani – Electric Bass
- Kristijan Krajncan – Drums
