= Four Darks in Red =

Painting by Mark Rothko

- Artist: Mark Rothko
- Year: 1958
- Medium: Oil on Canvas
- Dimensions: 259.1 cm × 294.6 cm (102.0 in × 116.0 in)
- Location: Whitney Museum of American Art; New York

Four Darks in Red is a 1958 painting by American painter Mark Rothko. It is currently in the collection of the Whitney Museum of American Art in New York City.

== Description ==
The painting is composed of four dark, rectangular forms set against a red field. This work, like Rothko's other paintings in the late 1950s, features a dark palette. Four Darks in Red precedes Rothko's Seagram murals, which share this work's red, maroon, and black hues.
