= Here Comes a Riot =

Studio album by Marzio Scholten
- Released: April 2015 (NL) (CD)
- Recorded: by Philip J. Harvey at Amsterdam Recording Company, Amsterdam, February 7, 2015.
- Genre: Jazz
- Length: 27:41 (CD)
- Label: Self produced
- Producer: Marzio Scholten

Professional ratings
Review scores
| Source | Rating |
|---|---|
| Volkskrant | 4/5 stars |
| nrc.next | 4/5 stars |

Here Comes a Riot is a self-produced album by Marzio Scholten's IDENTIKIT which was released on April 17, 2015.

Dutch newspaper NRC.NEXT was the first to review this album on 14 April 2015 and rated it with four (****) stars.

== Track listing ==
1. Here Comes a Riot - 2:27
2. Wilco - 7:10
3. The Day We Lost It All - 5:09
4. Erath - 7:32
5. We Stand Alone - 4:58

All compositions by Marzio Scholten

== Personnel ==
- Marzio Scholten - Guitar
- Lars Dietrich - Alto sax
- Jasper Blom - Tenor sax
- Sean Fasciani - Electric bass
- Niek de Bruijn - Drums
