= Marzio Scholten =

Dutch jazz guitarist and composer (born 1982)

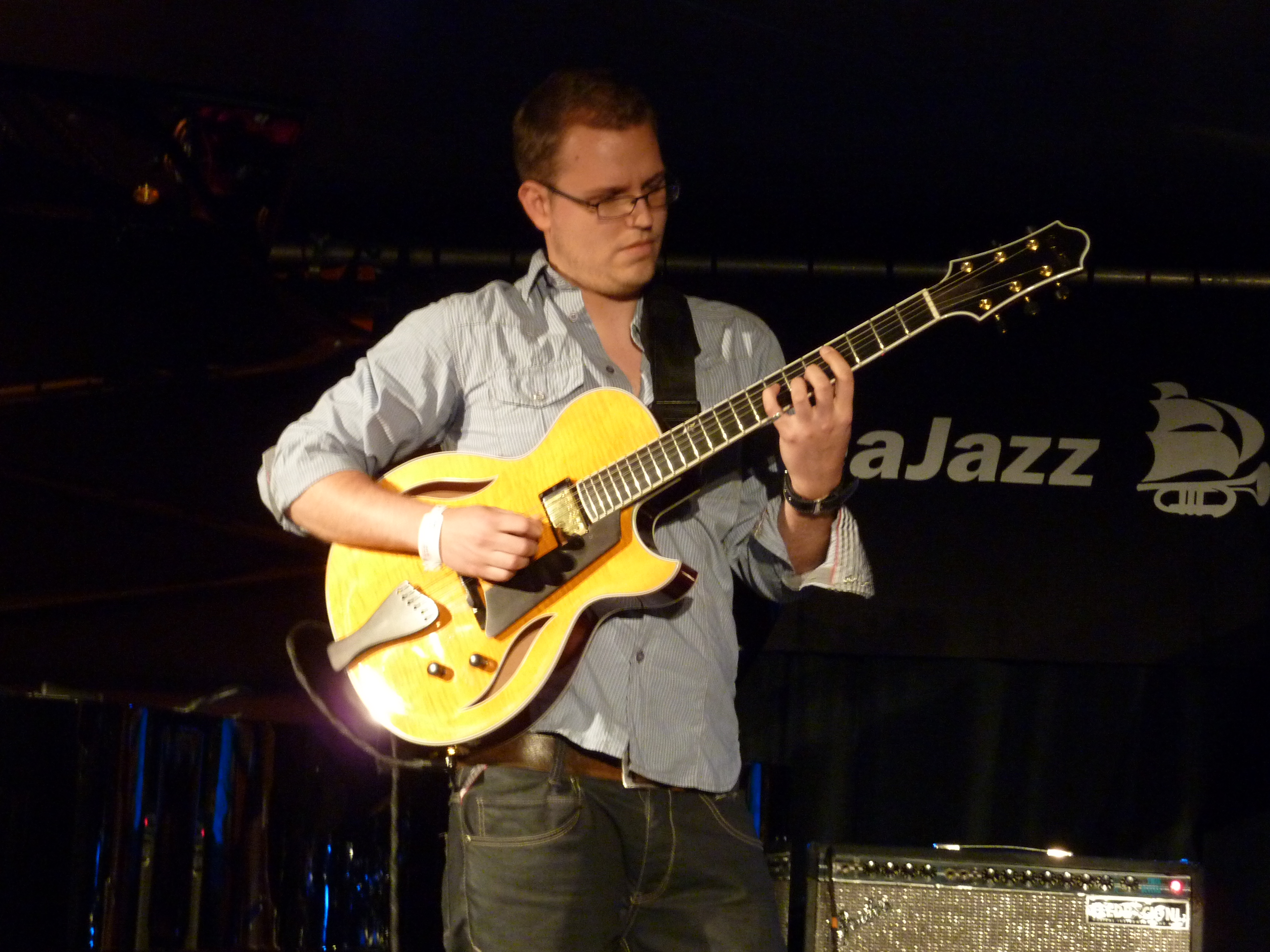
- Marzio Scholten, North Sea Jazz Festival, 2009

Background information
- Born: 17 June 1982 (age 43); Granollers, Spain
- Genres: Jazz
- Occupation: Musician
- Instrument: Guitar
- Years active: 2002–present
- Website: Official site

Marzio Scholten (born in Granollers, Spain, 17 June 1982) is a Dutch jazz guitarist and composer.

== Biography ==
He is considered as one of the leading modern jazz guitarists and composers of The Netherlands. His Marzio Scholten Group is popular in the Dutch modern jazz scene.

In June 2008, after graduating from the Amsterdam Conservatory a couple of years earlier, he released his debut album – Motherland. In 2009, he was nominated for the Deloitte Jazz Award.

His second album – World of Thought, was released in October 2010 and received reviews worldwide. The same reviewer selected World of Thought as one of the best international releases of 2010. In The Netherlands, World of Thought ended up being in the Top 10 best jazz releases that year.

In May 2012, Scholten released his third album – Voids, Echoes and Whispers, which received positive reviews in The Netherlands, U.S., and Japan, where the readers of Tokyo Jazz Notes selected Voids, Echoes and Whispers as runner-up in the category – Best International Jazz Album of 2012.

Scholten has performed at the North Sea Jazz Festival, Bimhuis, Muziekcentrum Vredenburg, Royal Theatre Carré and The Hague Jazz.

Scholten's bands, Marzio Scholten Group/Marzio Scholten Quartet, consist of Yaniv Nachum (saxophone), Randal Corsen (piano), Stefan Lievestro (double bass), and Mark Schilders (drums). Compositions are written and arranged by guitarist and bandleader – Scholten. Improvisation is important, as well as the mixing of modern jazz with other genres. Scholten's music can be described as modern creative jazz.

== Discography ==
=== As leader ===
- 2008: Motherland (O.A.P.)
- 2010: World of Thought (O.A.P.)
- 2012: Voids, Echoes and Whispers (self-produced)
- 2013: Garage Moi (self-produced)
- 2015: Here Comes A Riot (self-produced)
- 2016: Hymn - single (self-produced)
- 2017: We Never Left Town (self-produced)
- 2018: A Real Life Photograph (Vol.1) (self-produced)
- 2019: Isolophilia (self-produced)

=== As a sideman ===
- 2010: Patches of Blue, Marike van Dijk
- 2011: Flow, Iman Spaargaren Quartet & Septet
