= Julian Niccolini =

American restaurateur

Julian Niccolini is an Italian-American restaurateur, who co-owned the now defunct Four Seasons Restaurant in New York City.

== Early life ==
Niccolini was born in Lucca, Italy. One of his early jobs was at the Hôtel de Paris in Monaco. Niccolini moved to New York City in 1975.

== Career ==
Niccolini joined the Four Seasons Restaurant in 1977 and quickly became its public face. In 1994, he and Alex von Bidder became its primary operating partners. Niccolini created a club-like dining room at the restaurant named the "Grill Room", where patrons conducted business during lunch, although he remarked that "everybody [in the room] claims to be serious, but they are actually having fun." In December 2018, Niccolini was forced to resign from the Four Seasons Restaurant over accusations of sexual misconduct.

Niccolini has been nominated for seven James Beard Awards, winning three. He has had parts in several movies, including Inside Man (2006), Arbitrage (2012) and Self/less (2015).

== Personal life ==
Niccolini is an avid cyclist and dog lover. He practiced beekeeping at his home in Bedford, New York.

In June 2015, Niccolini was charged with the sexual abuse of a 28-year-old woman at the Four Seasons Restaurant. In March 2016, he pleaded guilty to misdemeanor assault, admitting that he had "put his hands on the woman, causing scratches and bruises to her hip and thigh".
