= Helena Klakocar =

Croatian artist alternative cartoonist (born 1958)

- Born: Helena Klakočar; March 11, 1958 (age 68) Tuzla, SR Bosnia and Herzegovina
- Areas: Artist, writer
- Awards: Prix Alph-Art du Meilleur Album Étranger for graphic novel Passage en douce, Festival d'Angoulême (2000)
- www.helenaklakocar.com

Helena Klakočar (born 1958) is a Croatian artist alternative cartoonist known for her autobiographical, social, and political observations.

== Life and work ==
Helena Klakočar was born in Tuzla, Bosnia and Herzegovina, into an ethnic Croat family. When she was seven years old, her family moved to Maribor, Slovenia, where she attended primary and grammar school.

She studied graphic art at the Art Academy in Zagreb, Croatia and became successful as a comics author, designer of posters and animation films.

In summer 1991, she went on a sailing holiday with her husband and two-year-old daughter. Their return from Greece was prolonged because of the outbreak of the war in the Former Yugoslavia. On a small catamaran during the winter, she was capturing daily life and memories of her homeland in drawings and text, depicted in her award-winning graphic novel Restless Sea 1 (in French Passage en douce), which is translated into several languages.

She received a grant from Fonds BKVB, Amsterdam, and later from Centre de la livre, Paris, to continue with this story.

== Awards ==
- 2019 - project resident at Cité Internationale des Arts, Paris
- 2016 - project resident at RECOLLETS Paris, City of Paris and Institut Francais
- 2000 - Prix Alph-Art du Meilleur Album Étranger for graphic novel Passage en douce, Festival d'Angoulême, France
- 2000 - Prix du Radio Info, for Passage en douce, France
- 2000 - "1st award for illustration", Stichting Tussen Hemel en Aarde, Netherlands
- 2000 - Stipendium Centre de la Livre, Paris, France
- 2001 - Work stipendium Fonds voor Kunst en Arhitektur, Amsterdam, Netherland
- 2002 - "The picture which was never taken”, Helsinki, Finland, lecture on symposia about graphic novels.
- 2003 - Guest artist Academia Solitude, Stuttgart, Germany.

== Works ==
=== Comics ===
- 2020 book REVOLT published by Vedis, Zagreb
- 2019: Publishing house VEDIS from Zagreb published her book ''WALL MEDITERRANEAN'', graphic reportage based on the interviews with the crew of the Croatian search and rescuing boat BŠ-72 Andrija Mohorovičić, who was involved in the operation Triton (Frontex)
- Graphic novel "Friesland (Restless Sea 2), 2009, Fabrika knjiga, Belgrade, Serbia,
- "Groote Reis", 2003, Aristej, Maribor, Slovenia
- Graphic novel "Passage en Douce (Restless Sea 1)", 1999, Freon, Bruxelles, Belgium (2000 - Prix Alph-Art du Meilleur Album Étranger for graphic novel Passage en douce, Festival d'Angoulême, France)

=== Films ===
- "Dance, Monster, on my gentle melody” with group Zzot, Zagreb, 1985 (awarded in Belgrade, 1986)
- "Tai Chi" (with M. Manojlovic), Zagreb film studio, Zagreb, 1989
- "What happened with my friends", animation part in the P.de Pierpont film, Bruxelles, Belgium (film received many international awards).

=== Animated films ===
- Propaganda film for the Gallery SC, 1990/91, 4x 30 sec
- Realization of the ZZOTROPHE machine on the enlarged scale (5x5 m) for exhibition of the art groups in Marseilles, France, 1989.
