= Shigeharu Matsumoto =

Shigeharu Matsumoto (松本 重治, Matsumoto Shigeharu, 1899–1989) was an internationalist. He was founder of the International House of Japan and a pioneer in building constructive relations between Japanese and others through shared knowledge of their diverse histories, needs and national aspirations. He was an influential journalist and an active participant in the internationalization of Japan in the latter part of the twentieth century. He was awarded the Ramon Magsaysay Award in 1980.

== Early life ==
Matsumoto was brought up in Osaka, Japan. He studied law and English at Tokyo University before going to the United States in 1923 to study economics and history at Yale University. He went on to Europe in 1925, where he interpreted for Japanese delegates at an ILO conference in 1926. His ambition of becoming a professional journalist was fulfilled when he was appointed as the head of the Shanghai bureau of the Rengo (later Domei Tsushin) news agency.

== Journalism ==
In 1936 his report of the Xi'an incident was his first real reporting experience. In 1939, Matsumoto became editor in chief of Domei. He held this post until he fell ill in 1943.

== Personal ==
Matsumoto was the widower of Hanako Matsutaka. Surviving are two sons, Hiroshi and Ken, and a daughter, Misao Maki, all of Tokyo.
