= International House of Japan =

Cultural exchange organization

- 公益財団法人国際文化会館
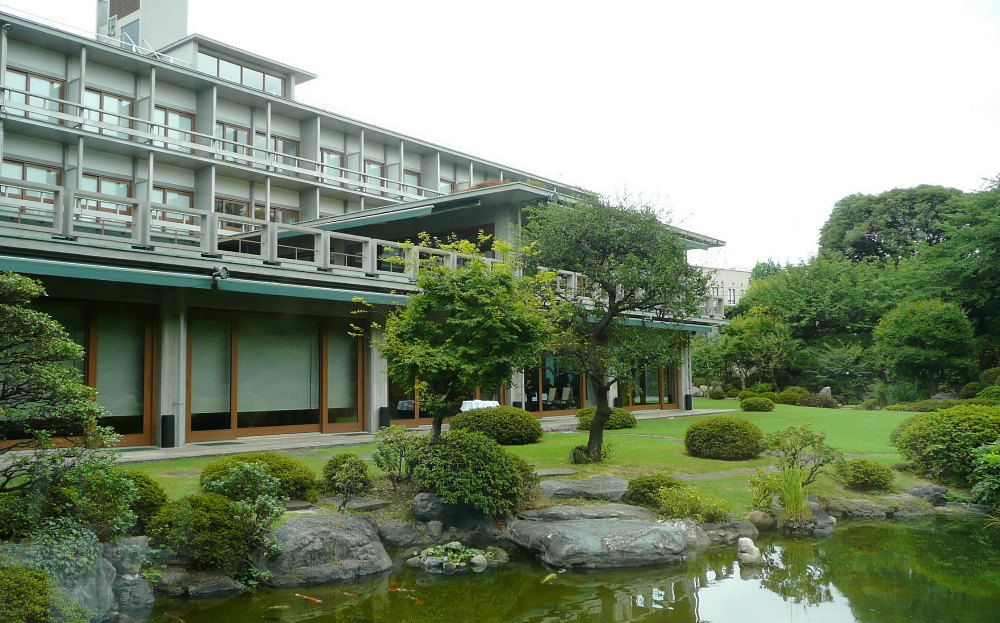
- Tokyo building
- Purpose: Cultural Exchange
- Location: Roppongi, Tokyo, Japan
- Coordinates: 35.6585°N 139.7334°E
- Website: ihj.global/en/

International House of Japan, also known as I-House, is an organization and building based in Roppongi, Tokyo.

== Organization ==
After World War II, the Allies occupied Japan through 1952. The United States State Department supported cultural programming from non-governmental institutions to fight the spread of Communism, build mutual understanding between the two countries, and change anti-American sentiment among Japanese intellectuals. John D. Rockefeller III proposed a cultural exchange program funded by his Rockefeller Foundation and the Japanese government. Though Rockefeller emphasized the engagement as private philanthropy, the program had the American government's backing.

Rockefeller collaborated with cultural leaders Aisuke Kabayama, Tamon Maeda, Shigeharu Matsumoto, Yasaka Takagi, all of whom he had previously met in 1929. Reestablishing with them in a late 1951 visit, this team developed cultural exchange programs beginning with the International House of Japan, also known as I-House, in 1955 in Tokyo's Roppongi district. Rockfeller chose Matsumoto to lead the team, being the most active and committed to the cultural exchange. Other Japanese politicians and businessmen financed the project, with fundraising and real estate provisions from the Prime Minister Yoshida, Finance Minister Hayato Ikeda, and Secretary of Finance Minister Kiichi Miyazawa.

== Building ==
The Tokyo building was completed in 1955 on the site of a former Kyogoku clan samurai feudal lord mansion. Maekawa Kunio, Sakakura Junzo, and Yoshimura Junzo designed the new building to bridge modern materials and its garden, as was traditional in pre-modern Japan. Its green rooftop combined the garden with the building. The garden preceded the building, designed by Ogawa Jihei VII and completed in 1929.

A new west wing for the building is under development from architects at SANAA with plans to open in 2030. It will host the collection of the former Kawamura Memorial DIC Museum of Art (closed in 2025) including a dedicated Rothko room for seven of his Seagram murals.

== Bibliography ==
- Kumano, Ruriko (2023). Japan Occupied: Survival of Academic Freedom. Singapore: Springer Nature. doi:10.1007/978-981-19-8582-9. ISBN 978-981-19-8581-2.
