= Four Seasons Restaurant =

Restaurant in New York City (1959–2019)

The Four Seasons
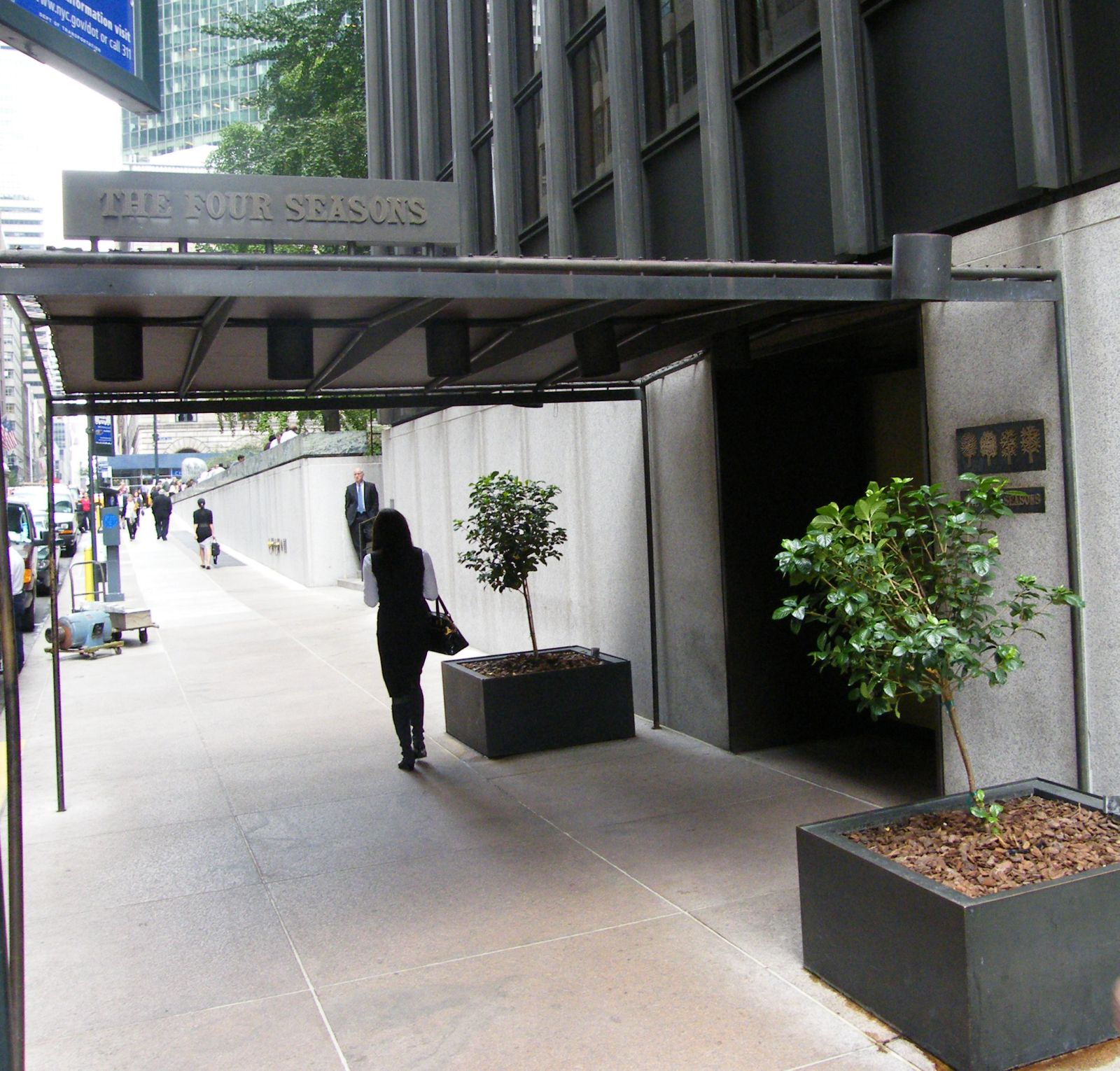
- The original 52nd Street entrance to the Four Seasons Restaurant
- Interactive map of The Four Seasons

Restaurant information
- Established: 1959
- Closed: 2019
- Owners: The Bronfman family, Alex von Bidder, and Julian Niccolini
- Food type: New American cuisine
- Location: 42 East 49th Street, New York, New York, New York
- Coordinates: 40°45′29″N 73°58′19.5″W
- Website: www.fourseasonsrestaurant.com

The Four Seasons Restaurant (known colloquially as the Four Seasons) was a New American cuisine restaurant in the Midtown Manhattan neighborhood of New York City from 1959 to 2019. The Four Seasons operated within the Seagram Building at 99 East 52nd Street for most of its existence, although it relocated to 42 East 49th Street in its final year of operation. The restaurant was themed around the seasons of the year, with menus, decorations, and vegetation that changed every three months. It attracted numerous high-profile personalities and often hosted "power lunches". Despite mixed commentary of the restaurant's food, the Four Seasons was highly popular, winning the James Beard Award many times.

The Four Seasons was created in order to fill a vacant space next to the Seagram Building's lobby. Originally operated by Restaurant Associates, the Four Seasons opened on July 20, 1959, and soon became a popular luxury restaurant. Following a downturn in patronage in 1973, Tom Margittai and Paul Kovi acquired the Four Seasons, which became known for its power lunches. In 1994, Margittai and Kovi passed operation of the restaurant to their junior partners, Alex von Bidder and Julian Niccolini, who operated the restaurant until the Seagram Building location closed in July 2016. After a two-year hiatus, von Bidder and Niccolini reopened the restaurant on 49th Street in August 2018, but the Four Seasons was unprofitable in its new location and closed permanently on June 11, 2019.

The interior of the original restaurant was primarily designed by Philip Johnson, who worked with several designers, including L. Garth and Ada Louise Huxtable. The interior consisted of two discrete spaces known as the Grill Room and the Pool Room, connected by a corridor, as well as a basement lobby on 52nd Street. The New York City Landmarks Preservation Commission designated these spaces as an interior landmark in 1989. The spaces had plantings and custom tableware and furniture.

Art inside the restaurant included a permanent mural by James Rosenquist; a major Richard Lippold sculpture; a curtain designed by Pablo Picasso; and temporary exhibitions that included works by Joan Miró, Frank Stella, Ronnie Landfield, and others. The restaurant attracted celebrities, businessmen, and politicians including Anna Wintour, Henry Kissinger, Martha Stewart, Bill Clinton, George Lois, Bill Bernbach, Jackie Kennedy, and Princess Diana.

== History ==
The Seagram Building in Midtown Manhattan, New York City, had been completed in 1958 to designs by Ludwig Mies van der Rohe, Philip Johnson, and Kahn & Jacobs. During the building's planning, the space behind the ground-story lobby had been intended as a major public area. A crafts museum, an automotive showroom, and an upscale restaurant, were variously proposed for that space. Philip Johnson described it as "leftover space", saying that "we could as well have put a Chrysler showroom there". The building's leasing agent Cushman & Wakefield selected Joseph Baum of Restaurant Associates in 1957 to operate the Four Seasons Restaurant in the space. Samuel Bronfman, the chairman of the building's developer Seagram, agreed to the restaurant plan after he learned that it would increase his building's value.

The restaurant's managers had free rein to create a restaurant, which ultimately cost $4.5 million (equivalent to $38,000,000 in 2025). At the time, it was the most expensive restaurant ever built in New York City. Philip Johnson was hired to design the Four Seasons, as Mies was uninterested in designing the restaurant space inside the Seagram Building. William Pahlmann was also hired for general design; Richard Kelly for lighting design; Karl Linn for landscaping; Everett Lawson Conklin for horticultural detail; Marie Nichols for weavings; and Richard Lippold for the Grill Room's brass sculptures. Interiors magazine said that Restaurant Associates was "evidently convinced that in interiors, as well as food, you get what you pay for".

=== Opening and early years ===
The restaurant opened on July 20, 1959. Time magazine described the Four Seasons as employing "25 chefs and bakers and a battalion of 125 cummerbunded captains, waiters, wine stewards, barmen and busboys". Conversely, The New York Times wrote that there were 15 busboys, 20 captains, and 50 waiters. The Four Seasons' staff had their own seamstress and a chef who cooked exclusively for them. The executive chef was Albert Stockli, who created several menu items specifically for the restaurant and worked with Restaurant Associates until 1965. Dishes on the Four Seasons' menu were sourced from around the world. At the time of the restaurant's opening, The New York Times reported that lunch typically cost $6, while dinner cost $10 to $12, excluding alcoholic beverages. The opening of the Four Seasons prompted other New York restaurant owners to boycott Seagram liquor, as the company had helped finance a competitor within its own building.

Soon after its opening, the Four Seasons became a popular event venue. For example, it hosted a birthday party for then-U.S. president John F. Kennedy in May 1962, as well as a dinner for the Confrérie des Chevaliers du Tastevin wine-tasting organization in December 1962. Kennedy's birthday party was the first time that the restaurant was completely closed to the public, but a similar closure also occurred in 1965, when Sharman Douglas hosted a party there for Princess Margaret. The stature of the restaurant was such that, according to Peter Hellman of New York magazine, Stockli "could barely be bothered to greet" a visiting royal family who walked through the door. The Four Seasons was also a popular drinking spot in the mid-1960s.

By the early 1970s, the restaurant was past its prime. This was in part due to the New York City fiscal crisis, as well as the fact that younger audiences were not necessarily interested in the Four Seasons' unconventional menu items. The Wall Street Journal said that "power lunchers looked the place over, saw tourists, and were horrified". Though the restaurant still attracted a loyal following on weekends, it was no longer popular on weekdays. Philip Johnson recalled that, on one day in early 1973, he and his partner John Burgee were the only people eating lunch at the Four Seasons. Restaurant Associates initially decided to continue operating the Four Seasons, which was one of the company's flagship restaurants, even as it closed other restaurants to save money. The firm ultimately decided to give up its lease of the Four Seasons by 1973, though it took over a year for Restaurant Associates to relinquish its lease.

=== Margittai and Kovi operation ===
Restaurant Associates vice president Tom Margittai and Four Seasons director Paul Kovi acquired the Four Seasons in 1973. Shortly afterward, Margittai and Kovi hired Joseph "Seppi" Renggli as the executive chef; under Renggli's leadership, the Four Seasons added new menus for each season. The new operators hired George Lois to design a full-page advertisement, which was published in The New York Times on May 15, 1974. Margittai and Kovi concentrated their efforts on attracting guests; for example, after Margittai called back a customer who wrote a two-page letter complaining about the quality of the service, that customer became a regular. The men also had their staff "study religiously their customers' desires" by remembering their orders. One of the two rooms, which had been a bar, was converted to the Grill Room, which served simpler meals than the more upscale Pool Room. By 1975, Joseph Baum said that Margittai and Kovi had "done a superb job" in restoring the Four Seasons to its former elegance.

In the 1970s and 1980s, many of the Four Seasons' most important guests worked in the publishing and journalism industries, and the restaurant became widely known for its power lunches. The book publisher Michael Korda said in 1977 that the Grill Room was "the most powerful place to eat lunch in town". Two years later, an Esquire article declared the Grill Room to be the setting for "America's Most Powerful Lunch". According to CNN, the term "power lunch" may have come from the Esquire article. Upon its 20th anniversary, the restaurant largely retained its original appearance, although the trees and some of the tableware had been replaced. A mural by James Rosenquist was installed in the Pool Room for the restaurant's 25th anniversary in 1984. The Four Seasons' operators further redecorated the restaurant in 1988 at a cost of $500,000.

When the New York City Landmarks Preservation Commission (LPC) was considering designating the Seagram Building as a city landmark in 1989, Margittai and Kovi separately endorsed landmark designation for the restaurant. The Seagram Company, as well as the building's then-owner Teachers Insurance and Annuity Association of America (TIAA), opposed designating the restaurant as a landmark, even as they endorsed similar protections for the Seagram Building and its lobby. On October 3, 1989, the Four Seasons became New York City's second landmarked restaurant, after Gage and Tollner in Brooklyn.

In January 1990, the New York City Board of Estimate ratified the designation. The TIAA sued the LPC in 1990 to overturn the landmark designation for the Four Season, arguing that the restaurant was personal property and that the designation would force the restaurant to continue operating even if the owners wished to close it. The Four Seasons' operators had supported landmark designation precisely for that reason, as it would give the operators more leverage when they renegotiated their lease. The lawsuit was escalated to the New York Court of Appeals, which upheld the designation in 1993.

Meanwhile, following the Black Monday stock market crash in 1987, patronage at the Four Seasons had started to decline. In the year following the crash, business decreased by as much as 15 percent, and Margittai and Kovi had to fire some of the staff. In part because of the declining business, Renggli resigned as the restaurant's executive chef in 1990. Christian Albin was hired to replace him. Even in early 1992, the Grill Room still had only six to ten patrons on a typical night. Patronage recovered by the end of 1992, when the Grill Room was filled to capacity at night.

=== Von Bidder and Niccolini operation ===
==== 1990s and 2000s ====
In 1994, Margittai and Kovi passed operation of the restaurant to their junior partners, Alex von Bidder and Julian Niccolini, who continued to run the restaurant in the Seagram Building for two decades. At the time, von Bidder had expressed optimism that the restaurant would again become a popular venue for business lunches. During this decade, financial executives came to frequent the Four Seasons. Seagram & Sons bought a majority stake in the restaurant from Margittai and Kovi in 1995, and they renewed the restaurant's lease for 17 years in 1998. Power lunches at the Four Seasons again declined following the September 11 attacks in 2001, though they had started to return within two years.

French media conglomerate Vivendi, which acquired the Seagram Company in 2000, started selling off the Seagram Building's art in 2003 to raise money. These included some of the artwork in the Four Seasons, which were generally not protected as a city landmark, with the exception of Richard Lippold's sculptures. Christian Albin, the Four Seasons' executive chef, died suddenly in June 2009. Fabio Trabocchi was hired as the Four Seasons' executive chef in October 2009, but he left that position after only three months.

In April 2010, Pecko Zantilaveevan, a longtime sous chef, was promoted to the executive-chef position. The Four Seasons also hired a second executive chef, Larry Finn. Further controversy over the restaurant's artwork arose in 2014 when the Seagram Building's owner, Aby Rosen, proposed removing the Pablo Picasso tapestry Le Tricorne, which was not protected as a landmark. The artwork was ultimately removed following a lawsuit and relocated to the New-York Historical Society.

==== Demise ====
In mid-2015, Rosen announced that the restaurant's lease would not be extended upon its expiry the following year. His company RFR Realty proposed changes to the Four Seasons' interior, which the LPC largely rejected, except for a replacement of the carpet. Prior to this announcement, Niccolini and von Bidder had conflicted with Rosen for the preceding several years. The Four Seasons' rent increased from $20 to $105 per square foot ($220 to $1,130/m^{2}). The Seagram Building location closed after dinner service on July 16, 2016.

Soon after, on July 26, auctioneer Wright sold the furnishings of the restaurant inside the old Pool Room. The sale was originally estimated to bring in $1.33 million but, by the end of the auction, it had brought in $4.1 million. The items were sold at unusually high prices: for example, four ashtrays were sold for $12,500 and a banquette sold for $52,500. Rosen opened two new restaurants in the old Seagram Building space, known as the Pool and the Grill, which merged into a single restaurant in early 2020.

At the end of 2017, Niccolini and von Bidder announced that they would reopen the restaurant at 280 Park Avenue the next year, following a two-year delay. Prior to the restaurant's reopening, Diego Garcia was hired as executive chef and Bill Yosses were hired as pastry chef. The Four Seasons reopened at 42 East 49th Street (inside 280 Park Avenue) on the week of August 14, 2018. The new space, designed by Brazilian architect Isay Weinfeld, cost $30 million to build. This cost was partially funded by donations from some of the Four Seasons' longtime patrons.

Many of the design elements evoked the décor of the former location. The space included a long hallway connecting the new restaurant's bar and dining room. The bar room had 50 seats and contained a sunken reflecting pool measuring 16 by 16 feet (4.9 by 4.9 m). The rectangular dining room had stone floors with irregular patterns; windows with gold-mesh panels; and metal rods on the ceiling. The new location was smaller than the original Seagram Building location, with 33 tables and a total of 299 seats.

In December 2018, von Bidder requested that Niccolini resign from his position due to sexual harassment allegations against the latter. The relocated restaurant struggled to make a profit in its new location, in part because the two co-owners had borrowed nearly $40 million to open its new location. Other issues included the declining popularity of the "power lunch", as well as the negative publicity surrounding Niccolini's resignation. The Four Seasons closed permanently on June 11, 2019. Indicative of the Four Seasons' troubles was that the restaurant had several empty tables during its final Saturday. In late 2019, the Brazilian firm Fasano Group leased the 280 Park Avenue space. In February 2022, Fasano opened an Italian restaurant there, retaining much of the décor of the second Four Seasons.

== Design ==
The interior of the original restaurant was primarily designed by Philip Johnson, who worked with several designers, including L. Garth Huxtable and Ada Louise Huxtable. At Restaurant Associates' request, Johnson also collaborated with William Pahlmann, who influenced the furniture arrangement and the kitchen's layout. Architectural critic Paul Goldberger wrote that the original spaces comprised "New York's first consciously modern restaurant".

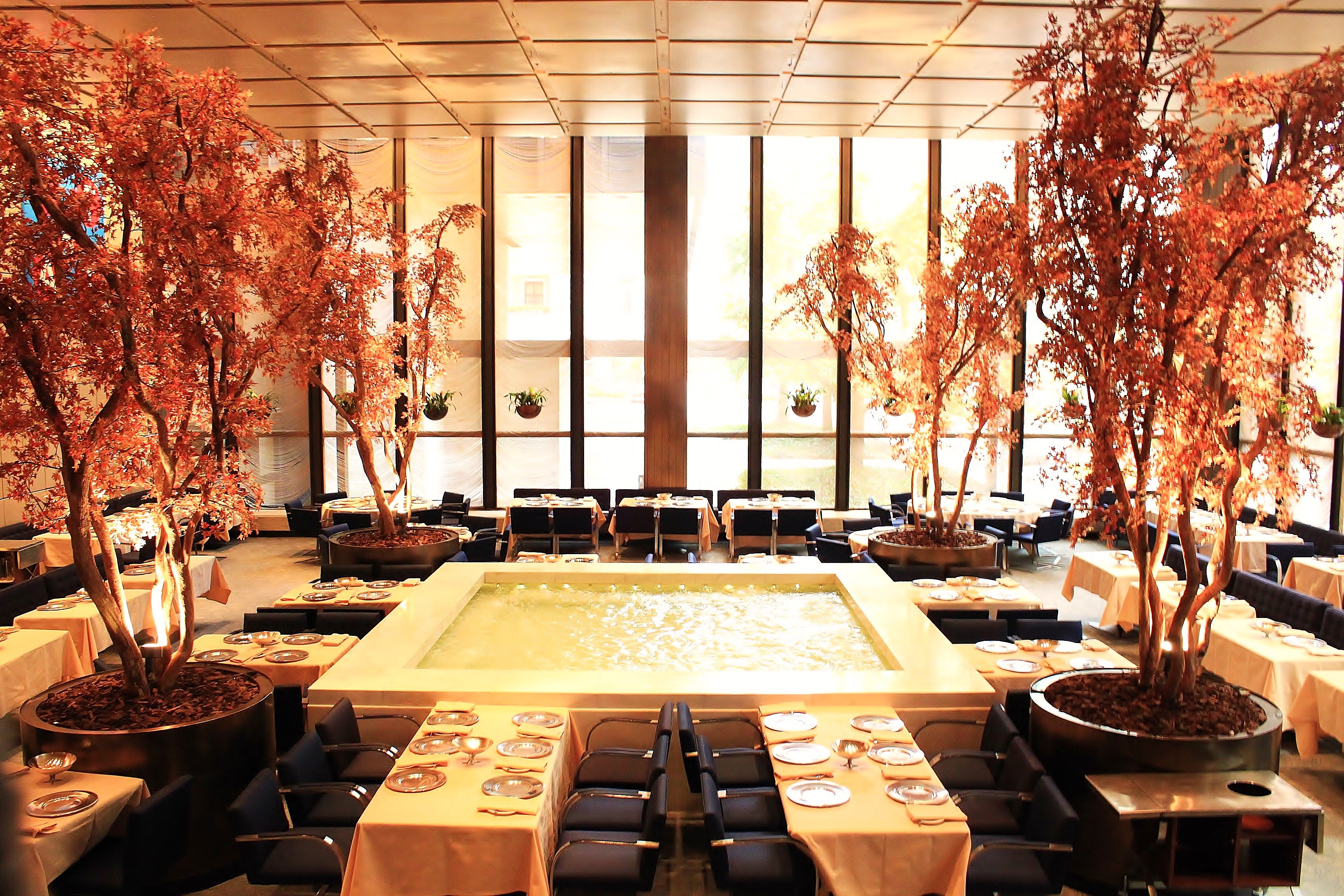
The Four Seasons' pool room

The space could be accessed either from the Seagram Building's lobby or from its own entrance on 52nd Street. The restaurant had five dining rooms, preserved in the modern-day Pool and Grill restaurants. (Note: The rooms had a maximum capacity of 400 or 485.) The former Pool Room is on the north side of the first floor and the former Grill Room is on the south side. There are two dining areas on a balcony above the Grill Room, as well as a balcony above the Pool Room. These spaces are within the first and second floors of the Seagram Building, east of the lobby. The restaurant could fit 485 diners simultaneously.

=== Pool Room and Grill Room ===
The Pool and the Grill are discrete 60-by-90-foot (18 by 27 m) rooms, designed as column-free spaces measuring 20 feet (6.1 m) high. As a result, the Seagram Building's engineers had to modify the tower's superstructure to transfer structural loads from the building's upper floors. The spaces contain design features similar to those in the Seagram Building's lobby, with travertine walls and floors; cement ceilings with gray-glass mosaic tiles; and bronze engaged piers. Carpets were attached to the floors using Velcro strips.

The ceilings consist of gridded off-white aluminum panels, laid in a pattern resembling a coffered ceiling; these panels contained recessed lighting. The Pool and the Grill have glass curtain walls with bronze mullions and a bronze railing. The windows had metal curtains designed by Marie Nichols. Air from hidden ventilating ducts caused the curtains to ripple; the direction and intensity of the ripples changed depending on the season. Johnson had suggested the installation of the curtains, but the rippling effects were an unintended consequence.

The Pool Room is centered around a 20-by-20-foot (6.1 by 6.1 m) white marble pool. Four large planters at the corners of the Pool's marble pool held fig trees. Both the pool and the planters were placed there upon Pahlmann's suggestion. The northern and western walls are glass curtain walls, while the southern wall is faced in walnut with rawhide panels, containing openings to the kitchen and restaurant corridor. On the eastern side of the Pool, a staircase connects to a mezzanine on a podium slightly above the main floor. Above the gray-rawhide base of the podium, a bronze railing and movable walnut partition separates the mezzanine and main Pool Room. The northern wall is a glass curtain wall while the eastern and southern walls had carpet panels. The floor in both spaces had a carpet designed like a grid.

The Grill Room, originally the Bar Room, has a lounge in its northwest corner and a bar at its southwest corner. It has a similar glass curtain wall on its western and southern walls, and French walnut walls on the north and east. The bar area had an ebonized walnut floor, separated from the dining area by a laminated-glass partition. The lounge area was separated from the main Grill by a walnut desk. The two private dining rooms are on a balcony raised above the main Grill, accessed by separate staircases and separated from the main Grill via walnut paneled doors. The smaller private room on the south and the larger room on the north are separated by a doorway with walnut sliding doors. The ceiling is similar to the main restaurant ceiling, with a black finish and irregularly scattered "punched holes" for lighting fixtures.

=== Other spaces ===
Running north–south between the Grill Room and Pool Room is a corridor, which is at the top of the stairs leading from the main lobby. The reservation desk was originally placed at the top of these stairs, but it was relocated to one side of the corridor in 1966. A glass wall and bronze double door separate the corridor from the main lobby. The corridor itself measures 70 feet (21 m) long and contains travertine floors and walls. The north and south walls of the corridor contain doors leading to vestibules outside either room. The vestibules contain luminous dropped ceilings, designed in an egg-crate pattern. The eastern wall of the Grill Room's vestibule has a coat-check area with French-walnut walls, while the eastern wall of the Pool Room's vestibule includes a wine cellar. East of this corridor, the two rooms are separated by a large kitchen with dishwashing facilities above.

The eastern section of the 52nd Street wing has an entrance that leads directly to the Grill and Pool restaurant, bypassing the main lobby. The site slopes down to the east, so the 52nd Street entrance is one story below the rest of the restaurant. At the time of the restaurant's opening, this was an unconventional layout; according to Johnson, "There was no precedent for bringing people in from down below and walking them up." The 52nd Street entrance leads to an entrance lobby and foyer with travertine floors, a gridded white ceiling, coat-check area, offices, and restrooms. The 52nd Street entrance is connected to the Grill Room via a staircase. The railings of the staircase are composed of two sets of staggered rods, which appear to shimmer whenever somebody walks up the stairs.

== Theming ==
=== Logo and colors ===
Emil Antonucci designed the Four Seasons Restaurant's logo. Antonucci procrastinated in designing the logo, finally drawing it up during the weekend before it was to be presented. The logo was composed of four hand-drawn trees, which appeared to be printed in a woodcut technique. There was one tree each in brown, pink, green, and red, each representing the winter, spring, summer, and autumn respectively. In the years after the logo was created, it became "one of the best-known restaurant logos in the world", according to New York magazine.

Variations of the logo's colors were used in staff uniforms, menus, and matchbooks, which were changed each season. The staff uniforms used azalea-colored cloth that was custom-made for the purpose. William Doerfler printed the menus, which were made of rough vellum and Japanese rice paper. They were so expensive to print that Joseph Baum was reluctant to reprint the menus if an item needed to be modified. Other items, including banquettes, were also changed to complement the overall theme.

=== Tableware and furniture ===
L. Garth Huxtable and Ada Louise Huxtable designed over a hundred items of tableware for the restaurant, ranging from champagne glasses to bread trays. The tableware took over nine months to design. According to the Huxtables, Restaurant Associates had requested that the Four Seasons have "a distinctive, identifiable line of accessories and equipment in keeping with the sophisticated elegance of the restaurant interiors". Different pieces of tableware were designed for each type of food or drink. For instance, there were separate wine and liquor glasses, and different tableware for cold and hot appetizers, fruit, vegetable, cheeses, caviar, and house specialties. The serving dishes and platters were made entirely of silver. Some pieces of tableware were quickly removed due to their impracticality, including wobbly fruit bowls and glassware with the restaurant's logo. Other pieces, including silverware for tableside cooking, were more durable and lasted for several decades.

The original furniture included upholstered-leather Brno chairs designed by Ludwig Mies van der Rohe and tulip tables designed by Eero Saarinen. The bar contained upholstered stools designed by Saarinen. Johnson designed simple, large dining tables for both rooms. The furniture and furnishings were sold off in July 2016. Some of the Four Seasons Restaurant's tableware and furniture are part of the permanent collection of the Museum of Modern Art (MoMA). These included 18 pieces of tableware that were placed in MoMA's Design Collection prior to the restaurant's opening.

=== Plants ===
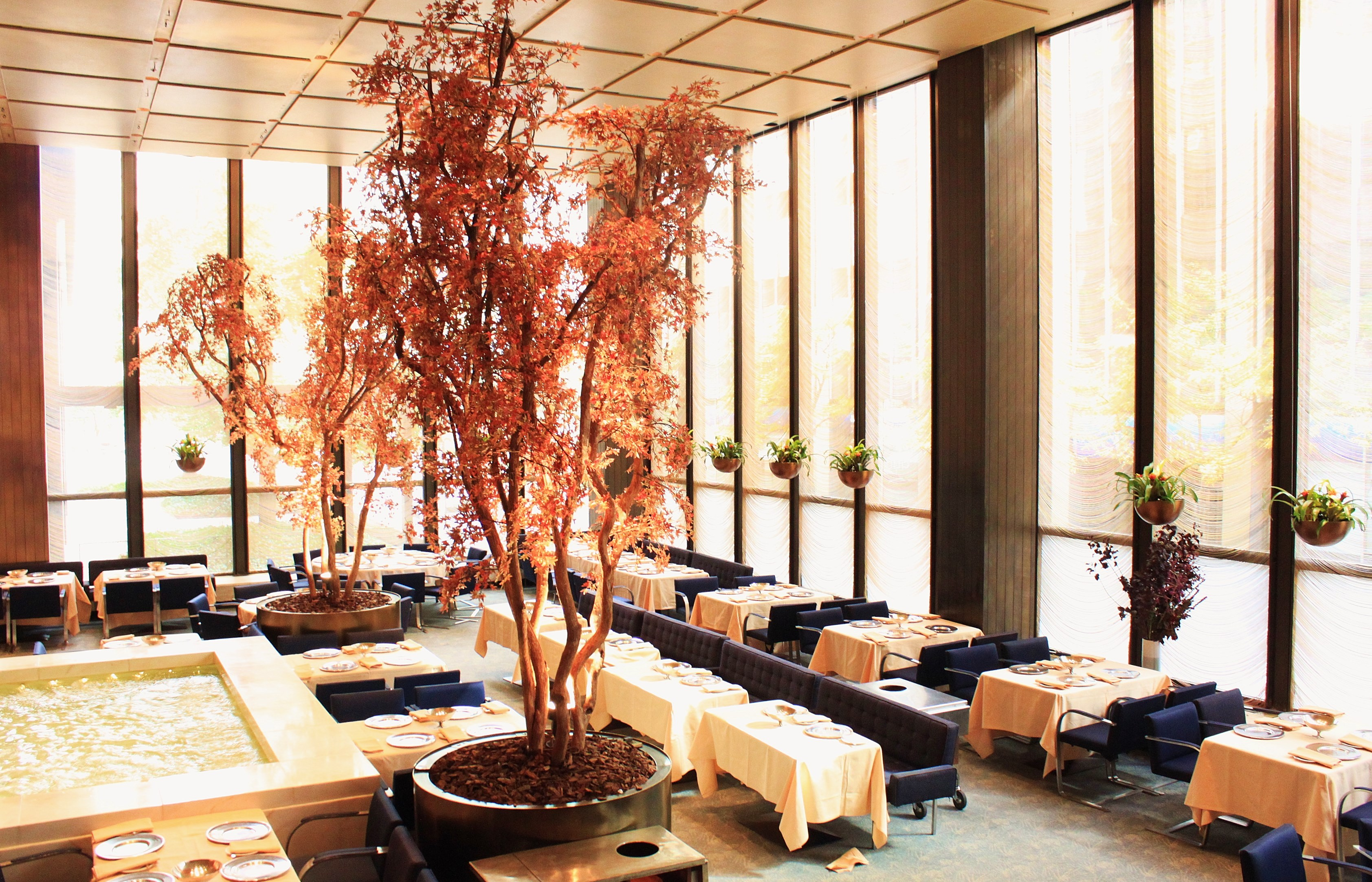
Trees inside the Pool Room

The restaurant had a $50,000 annual budget just for the maintenance of the plants, which included four fig trees, two podocarpus plants, a Swiss cheese plant, a fiddle leaf fig, and five philodendrons. Plants were changed four times a year. Each season's plantings were selected in part based on how well their color harmonized with the overall palette. Plantings in the spring included azaleas and birches; in the summer, palms and philodendrons; in the autumn, oak-leaf branches and mums; and in the winter, white birches. Some of the plantings stayed in the restaurant year-round, including grape ivy and nephthytis.

The fig trees around the Pool Room's pool measured 17 feet (5.2 m) tall and were swapped out four times a year. The trees in the Pool Room had to be small enough to squeeze through the doorways, yet hardy enough to thrive and grow once installed indoors. The restaurant's landscape architect, Karl Linn, wrote that he examined hundreds of nurseries to obtain the correct trees. Additional plants were placed along the walls and near the top of the restaurant. Next to the windows were several baskets, each of which contained seasonal plants.

To ensure the survival of the plants, the Four Seasons had its own microclimate and humidity, light levels and temperature were adjusted accordingly. Workers spent three hours a day watering, spraying, pruning and cleaning the plants. The air-conditioning system in each room provided sufficient humidity for the plants. The ceiling lights provided sufficient illumination for the plants near the top of each room, but the dim ceiling lights did not provide enough illumination for the other plants.

At night, plants were illuminated by mercury oxide lamps for eight hours. Every morning, between sunrise and the restaurant's opening time, all the lights were turned on at maximum brightness, and portable mercury vapor lamps were placed beneath the fig trees. To prevent the fig trees from growing too quickly, the room temperature was decreased by up to 8 °F (4.4 °C) after closing time, and the soil in the fig trees' planters was kept dry. Flowering plants were also replaced weekly.

=== Art ===
When the restaurant opened, Craig Claiborne of The New York Times wrote that the walls had "a fortune in art and tapestry". Richard Lippold designed artwork for the restaurant's ceiling, consisting of clusters of gold-colored brass rods. Lippold created two such artworks for the restaurant: one above the bar of the Grill Room and the other above the mezzanine of the Pool Room. There were either 3,000 or 4,000 rods in each sculpture. It took several months for Lippold and his assistant Marilynn Gelfman to install the rods in the Grill Room, which were suspended from two wires. Another of Lippold's associates, Gianni Morselli, then cleaned each rod at a cost of $20,000. The idea for the ceiling rods was devised because Johnson and Lambert wanted to make the 20-foot-tall (6.1 m) spaces seem more cozy without actually modifying the room's dimensions or the "elegance" of its design. According to The New Yorker, the artwork appeared to resemble "golden strokes of rain".

A 20-by-20-foot (6.1 by 6.1 m) curtain designed by Pablo Picasso for the Ballets Russes ballet Le Tricorne (1919) was hung in the foyer between the Grill Room and the Pool Room. The curtain is a portion of a Picasso tapestry used as a prop for the ballet that was purchased in 1957 by Phyllis Lambert, the daughter of the Seagram founder Samuel Bronfman, and installed prior to the restaurant's opening in 1959. The curtain was owned by the New York Landmarks Conservancy and was removed in 2014, being reinstalled at the New-York Historical Society.

In 1975, four Ronnie Landfield paintings from Philip Johnson's collection were installed on the wall that was initially supposed to host the Rothko commission. The artist James Rosenquist was commissioned to install a permanent mural in 1984, after which the Landfield paintings returned to Johnson's collection. Rosenquist's mural was known as Flowers, Fish and Females for the Four Seasons. The work measured 7.54 feet (2.30 m) high and 23 feet 11 inches (7.29 m) wide. It depicted two women's faces on either side of a group of fruits and flowers, with fish below them. The faces and the other motifs are overlaid in a manner resembling slits. The mural was hung on the eastern wall of the Pool Room's mezzanine, which was renamed the Rosenquist Room in honor of this work.

In addition to the works on permanent public display, there were other works and continuously revolving exhibitions in the dining rooms and the 52nd Street entrance walls. These included three rugs by Joan Miró, as well as paintings by Frank Stella and Jackson Pollock. The restaurant also hosted temporary exhibitions of sculptures, including those by Jean Dubuffet, Roy Lichtenstein, and Henry Moore. The Seagram Company had owned many of these works of art.

==== Uninstalled works ====
The artist Mark Rothko was hired in 1958 to paint the Seagram murals. He had wanted the dark paintings to sicken the restaurant's patrons. During the period in which Rothko worked on his murals, the Four Seasons rented Jackson Pollock's painting Blue Poles from its then-owner, art collector Ben Heller. Rothko canceled the commission after visiting the restaurant. The final series was dispersed and hung in three locations by the 2000s: the Tate Gallery in London; the Kawamura Memorial Museum in Sakura, Japan; and the National Gallery of Art in Washington, D.C. Rothko's murals were the only pieces of artwork that were commissioned specifically for the Four Seasons.

== Cuisine ==
The Four Seasons pioneered what later came to be called "New American Cuisine". When the Four Seasons opened, Time magazine wrote that the restaurant had "the highest-priced—and most exotic—menus in high-priced Manhattan", akin to the 21 Club, Colony Club, and Le Pavillon. Patrons could enjoy a sausage from one of the restaurant's "sausage trees" as they were being seated. Patrons could choose from a number of entrées. These included herbed lobster parfait, which consisted of pieces of lobster covered in hollandaise sauce and whipped cream; small clams with truffles and green onions; and beef marrow with cream and bouillon.

Main courses included "Violets in Summer Snow", "Sweet and Sour Pike in Tarragon Aspic", and "Piccata of Piglet in Pastry". By the 1990s, the restaurant offered such menu items as "Chinese egg rolls, French terrines, German spatzle, Italian penne, spa cuisine and good old scrambled eggs." Some dishes, such as Dover sole, were consistently offered throughout the restaurant's existence.

More elaborate dishes were typically served in the Pool Room, while the Grill Room had a simpler menu. Patrons could request fresh herbs on their dishes, contrary to most American restaurants, which at the time of the Four Seasons' opening did not provide fresh herbs. The Four Seasons was the first restaurant in the United States to cook using fresh, wild mushrooms. These were placed in salads and in filet mignon, sauces, and toast. The restaurant maintained its own herb garden for this purpose. Cotton candy was a house specialty, making the Four Seasons the first fine-dining restaurant to offer the confection. Six varieties of coffee were available.

The chef James Beard was a principal contributor to the development of its seasonal-food concept, pairing appropriate wines for each season. Frank Prial of The New York Times wrote that "wine is an integral part of the Four Seasons operation", in contrast with other restaurants, where the selection of wine was a secondary consideration. There were two air-conditioned wine cellars, one next to the Pool Room and the other in the basement; they collectively held 15,000 bottles. When the Four Seasons opened in 1959, Beard was hired to instruct the staff on the characteristics and history of each type of wine. By 1975, the restaurant had 260 types of wine on its regular menu, including 80 American wines. The restaurant had a special menu of 200 wines, which were available only in limited quantities. These special varieties represented about 1,000 total bottles.

== Clientele ==
The restaurant was known as much for its clientele as its food, with its Midtown location making it convenient for power lunches. The Four Seasons' clientele largely consisted of what Joe Baum described as "the achievers"; for many regular customers, the clientele was more important than the menu. Jeff Gordinier of The New York Times wrote that, even though the restaurant had hired celebrity chefs such as David Chang and Daniel Humm, the food "can seem like a supporting player". Town and Country magazine described the restaurant as a gathering place for influential figures in New York City. A 1988 Newsday account said one could "fill a gossip column for a week" just by looking at which customers sat with each other.

According to a 1986 New York magazine article, the management knew half of the Pool Room's guests by name, and 90 percent of Bar Room customers went there at least once a week. If the management did not know a customer's name, the guest would introduce themselves at the reservation desk, and their name would be written on a card. The card would be passed to the captain responsible for that guest's table, who would then address the customer by name.

The Four Seasons' management gave frequent patrons special treatment. According to Alex von Bidder, the restaurant once delivered a dinner to a "prized customer" in his hospital room in Boston. The restaurant's dress code prohibited clothing such as jeans and windbreakers, even for regular customers.

Typically, the Pool Room was more highly coveted than the Grill (Bar) Room, and the seats around the Pool Room's pool were more popular than those near the windows. The Wall Street Journal wrote in 1984: "At lunch time, serious people opt for the Bar Room, and have been doing so long before Michael Korda told them they should in his book on power." Despite the Four Seasons' stature, the rich and famous often dined among the general public, leading GQ food critic Alan Richman to describe the restaurant as "one of the last high-level democratic institutions". In the restaurant's later years, Julian Niccolini oversaw the restaurant's seating assignments. Niccolini deliberately seated conflicting parties, such as ex-boyfriends and ex-girlfriends, next to each other, describing himself as a "good devil".

=== Notable customers ===
In the earliest years of the Four Seasons' existence, frequent customers included lawyers Louis Nizer and Roy Cohn, U.S. senator Jacob Javits, and philanthropist Charles Revson. In addition, film producer Joseph E. Levine often hosted parties at the Pool Room, inviting movie stars such as Sophia Loren, Franchot Tone, Robert Wagner, and Natalie Wood. According to Julian Niccolini, later customers included Anna Wintour, Henry Kissinger, Martha Stewart, Bill Clinton, George Lois, Bill Bernbach, and Jackie Kennedy. Other frequent patrons included businessman Barry Diller, fashion designer Bill Blass, and businessman Samuel Irving Newhouse Jr.

Niccolini said in 1999 that only four regular patrons were always assigned the same table: Simon & Schuster editor-in-chief Michael Korda; the restaurant's own architect Philip Johnson; Seagram CEO Edgar Bronfman Jr.; and Seagram chairman Edgar Bronfman Sr. According to lawyer Robert H. Montgomery Jr., the junior Bronfman typically sat on the balcony, which was an unpopular place to sit until Edgar Jr. became CEO of Seagram. Architectural Record wrote in 2016: "In one corner, Table 32 still exudes the aura of having been 'owned' by Johnson for decades."

According to Niccolini, there were about 10 to 12 daily customers, including Art Cooper, Sandy Weill, and Richard Gelb, who were not always assigned the same table. Niccolini and his partner Alex von Bidder typically called these regulars every day, setting aside several tables for emergencies. The owners canceled the regulars' reservations if there was no response by noon. Niccolini said regular customers usually did not care about where they were seated, and most complaints about seating came from "people who are here only once a year and expect the best spot".

== Impact ==
=== Critical reception ===
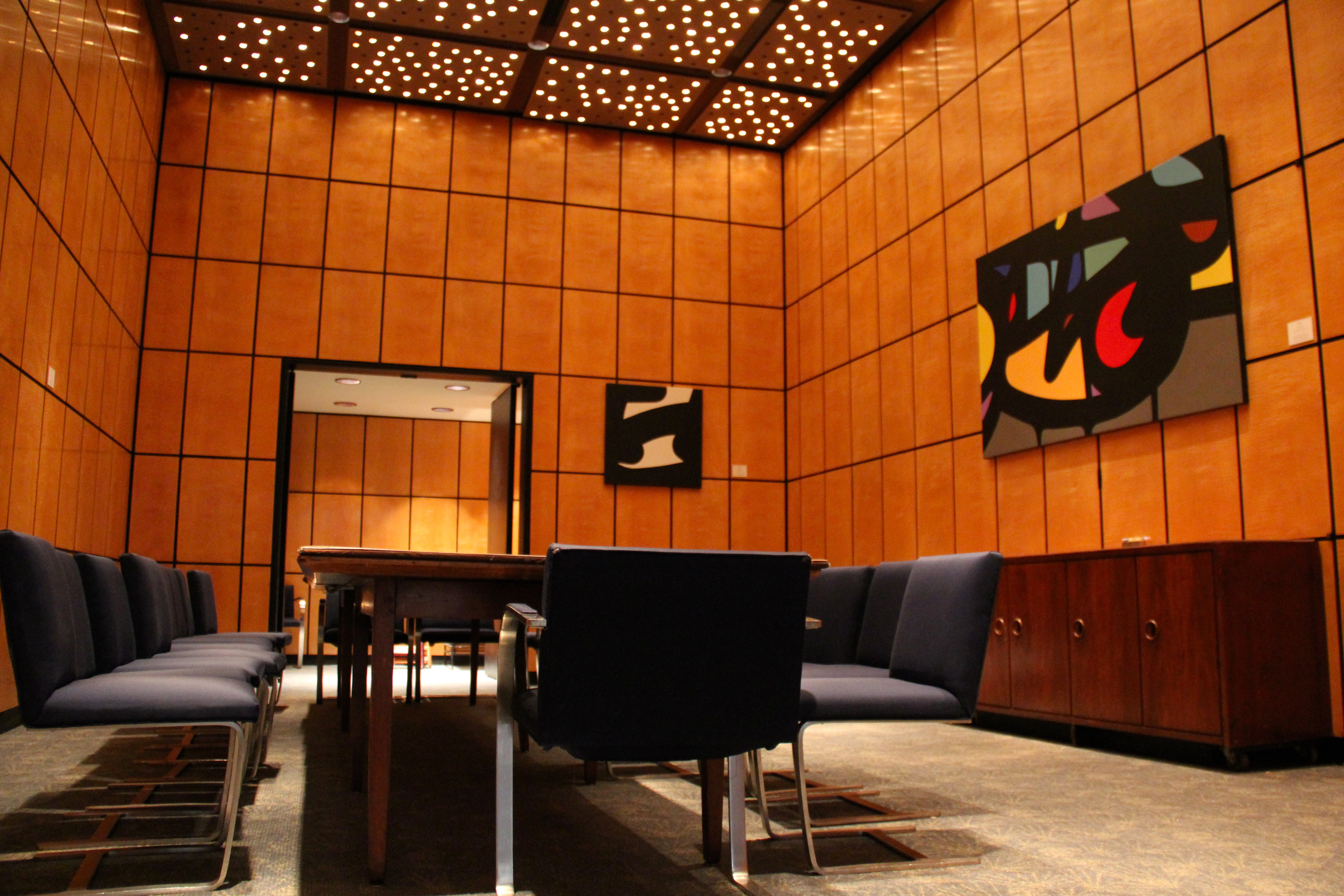
A private dining room at the Four Seasons

Reviews of the Four Seasons Restaurant largely praised the atmosphere, although commentary of the food itself was more mixed. When the Four Seasons first opened, Craig Claiborne wrote for The New York Times: "There has never been a restaurant better keyed to the tempo of Manhattan than the Four Seasons." New York Times food critic Mimi Sheraton gave the Four Seasons two out of four stars in 1979, writing that the restaurant had good acoustics and good service, but the quality of the food varied considerably. Bryan Miller, writing for the Times in 1985, gave the restaurant three stars for its design and service, although he objected to the quality of some dishes such as the peppery duck. Food critic Seymour Britchky described the gravlax as "almost inedible" and the snapper as "grilled until dry".

The interior design was also praised. Interiors magazine described the restaurant's design as combining "its exceptional sumptuousness with exquisite refinement". Paul Goldberger wrote: "The wood‐panel bar with its Lippold sculpture is at once warm and dignified; the main dining room with its central pool and vast spaces is luxurious." Conversely, Goldberger said the Four Seasons' decoration was relatively muted compared to that of other restaurants.

Commentary of the restaurant continued in later years. Peter Hellman wrote for New York magazine in 1986 that, although the food at the Four Seasons was "not the absolute best in town", the restaurant itself was a customer favorite. Zagat's New York City Restaurant Survey ranked the Four Seasons as the city's most popular restaurant from 1983 to 1988. Ruth Reichl of the Times gave the Four Seasons three of four stars in 1995, writing: "In its 35th year the restaurant that introduced the idea of changing seasonal menus to America is still a pioneer." Times critic Frank Bruni reduced the restaurant to two stars in 2007, saying that "the restaurant, like so much else, isn't quite what it was". When the Seagram Building location closed in 2016, The New York Times described the restaurant as "probably the most important New York restaurant of the 20th century".

After the Four Seasons reopened at its new location in 2018, it was broadly criticized, especially when compared to the Grill and Pool restaurants that replaced it at the Seagram Building. New York Times restaurant critic Pete Wells praised the food and the decoration, saying that Garcia "has turned the Four Seasons into a seafood restaurant, and a very good one". Even so, Wells gave the restaurant only one star, saying: "There is a good case to be made for not reviewing the newly relocated Four Seasons Restaurant at all but just leaving it on the slush pile, and that case can be found in court records involving Julian Niccolini." Adam Platt of Grub Street gave "two stars for the best of Garcia's cooking and the diligent service", but he subtracted one star "for the insane prices and the somewhat dated vibe".

=== Awards and media ===
The restaurant has won the James Beard Award several times, including for Outstanding Wine Service in 1997 and for Outstanding Service in 1998. The James Beard Foundation called the Four Seasons an "Outstanding Restaurant" in 1999 and described it as a "Design Icon" in 2016. In addition, the Four Seasons received the American Association of Nurserymen's special national award for indoor landscaping in 1960.

Margittai and Kovi published a Four Seasons cookbook in 1981. The book included autographs from notable customers, as well as recipes from the executive chef at the time, Seppi Renggli. The New-York Historical Society also sponsored a documentary film about the restaurant, It Happened Over Lunch, released in 2018.

== See also ==
- List of New American restaurants
- List of New York City Designated Landmarks in Manhattan from 14th to 59th Streets
