= World of Thought =

World Of Thought

Studio album by Marzio Scholten Group
- Released: October 2010 (NL) (CD)
- Recorded: E-sound Studio, Weesp, The Netherlands; January 14, 15 and 16, 2010
- Genre: Jazz
- Length: 67:48 (CD)
- Label: O.A.P. Records
- Producer: Barry Olthof

Professional ratings
Review scores
Source	Rating
"De Volkskrant"	4/5 stars
"Parool"	4/5 stars
"All About Jazz"	
"Draaiomjeoren"	5/5 stars

World Of Thought is an album by Marzio Scholten which was released on October 1, 2010, on O.A.P. Records.

Guitarist Anton Goudsmit wrote the liner notes for 'World Of Thought': "Marzio Scholten gives the Netherlands claim to yet another masterful Jazz guitarist. His wonderful band - the powerful and perfectly intonated double bass of Stefan Lievestro, the subtle and driven playing of pianist Randal Corsen, the deep touch of drummer Bob Roos and the brilliant guest performances by trumpet player Ambrose Akinmusire and tenor saxophonist Yaniv Nachum - performs Marzio's mature music inspiringly, doing right to the lyrical and clearly phrased guitar playing of this great talent. The pieces on this album, all composed by the master himself, vary in approach and are related, soundwise, to New York City's modern jazz scene. Marzio's guitar playing is honest, graceful and very recognizable. Enjoy!"

All About Jazz published an excellent review and selected ‘World Of Thought’ as one of the best international releases of 2010. In the Netherlands ‘World Of Thought’ ended up in the Top 10 of Best Jazz Releases of 2010.

== Track listing ==
1. Tricks - 7:32
2. Six Degrees of Separation - 8:08
3. Kismet - 8:44
4. Piano Intro To W.O.T. - 2:21
5. World Of Thought - 8:40
6. A Breath Of Love - 9:12
7. In The Machine - 7:25
8. The Puzzle - 9:09
9. Nebula - 6:24

All compositions by Marzio Scholten, except 'Piano Intro to W.O.T.' by Randal Corsen

== Personnel ==
- Marzio Scholten - Guitar
- Yaniv Nachum - Tenor Saxophone (tracks 1, 5, 7, 8)
- Ambrose Akinmusire - Trumpet (tracks 2, 6)
- Randal Corsen - Piano
- Stefan Lievestro - Double Bass
- Bob Roos - Drums
