= Kawamura Memorial DIC Museum of Art =

Art museum in Japan

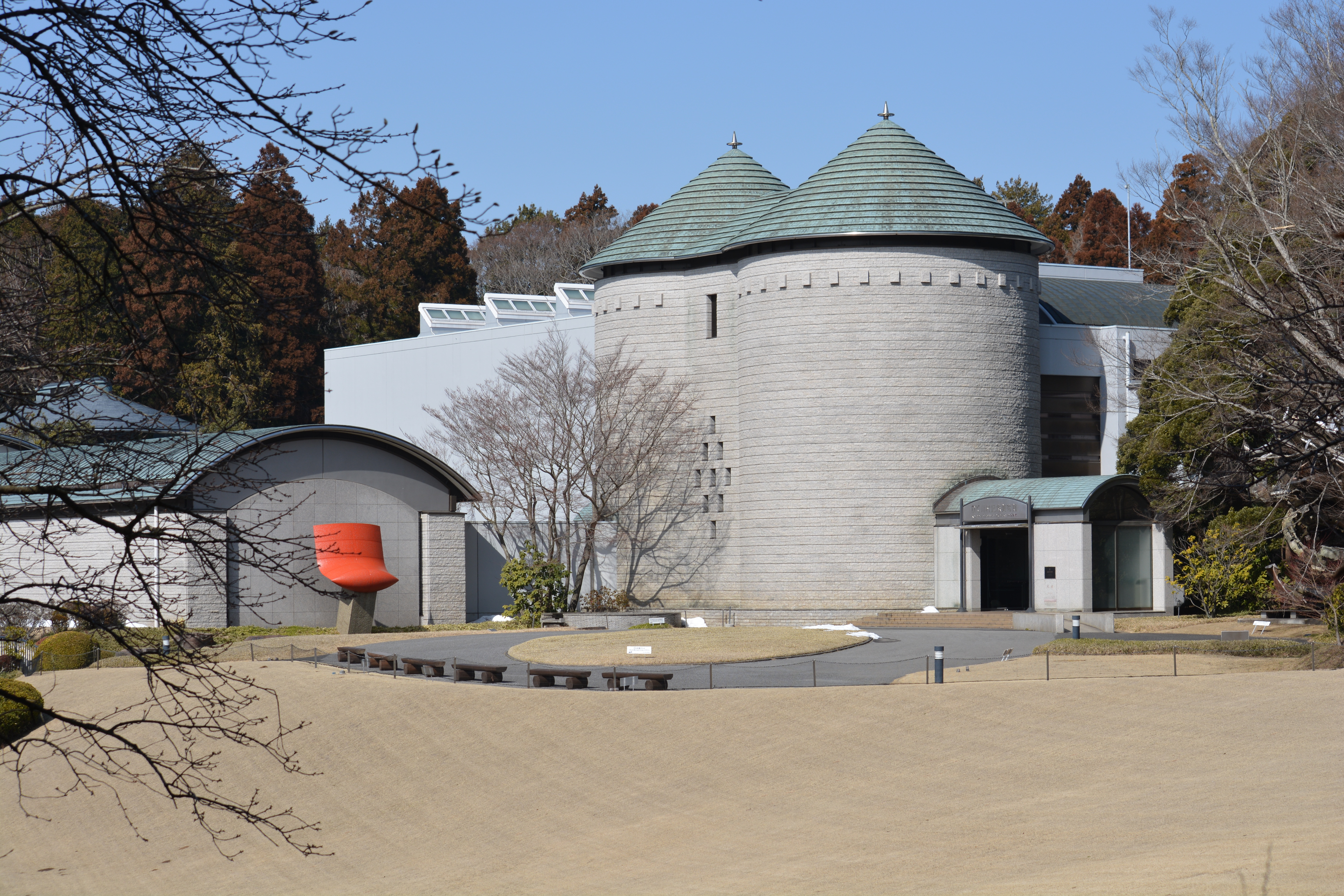
- Kawamura Memorial DIC Museum of Art
- Interactive fullscreen map
- Location: Sakura, Japan
- Coordinates: 35°39′12″N 140°13′17″E

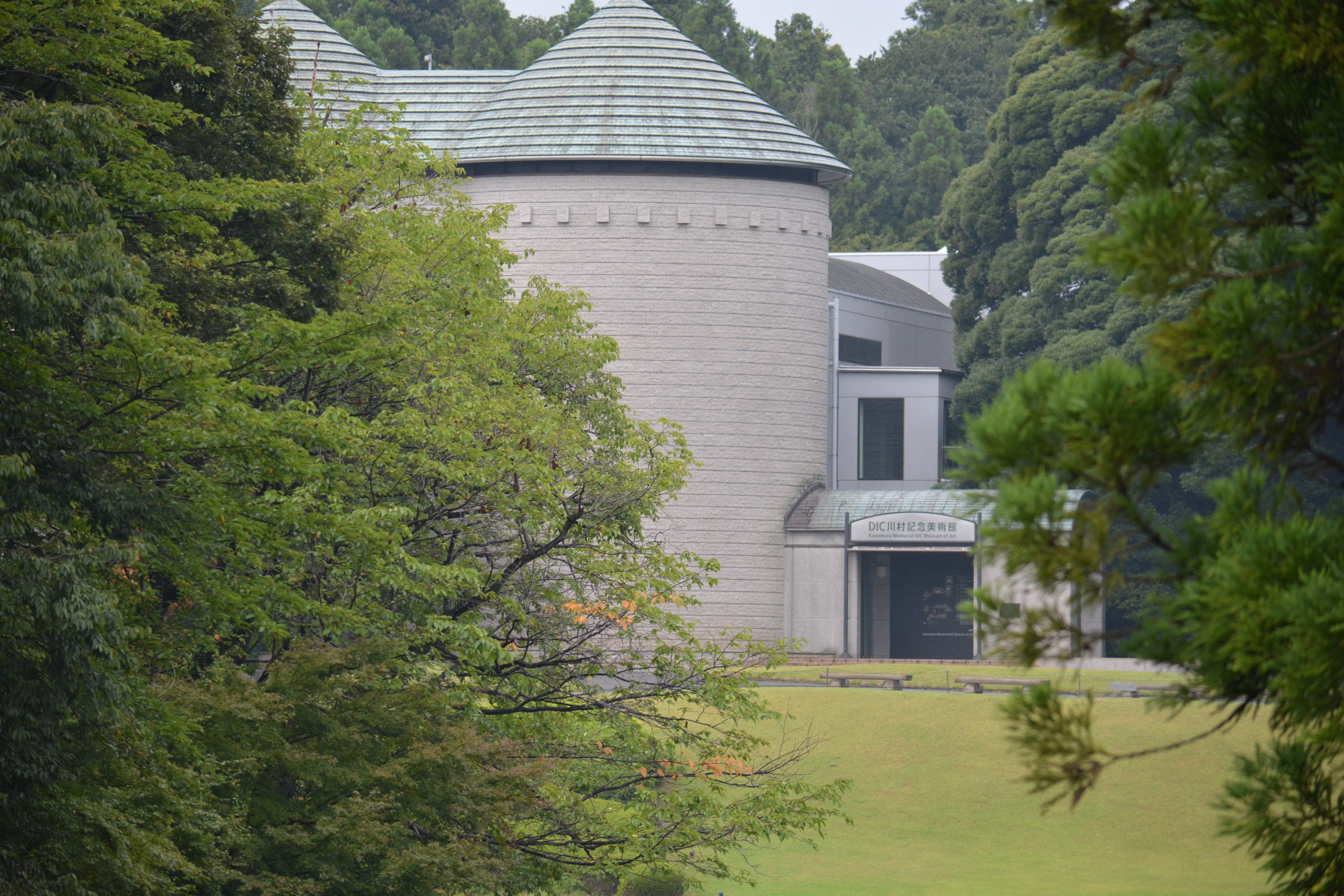
Kawamura Memorial DIC Museum of Art - Entrance

The Kawamura Memorial DIC Museum of Art (DIC川村記念美術館, DIC Kawamura Kinen Bijutsukan) (often shortened to Kawamura Memorial Museum) was an art museum in Sakura, Japan, designed by Ichiro Ebihara (海老原一郎, Ebihara Ichiro).

The museum opened in 1990 and its collection now contains more than 1000 works collected by the Japanese resin and ink manufacturer DIC Corporation. The project was largely the brainchild of Katsumi Kawamura, the former president of DIC, founder and first director of the museum, who had been collecting art since the 1970s. The Kawamura Memorial Museum contains artwork by a wide selection of American, European and Japanese artists, including special exhibitions of the works of Mark Rothko and Frank Stella. The museum is set in a 30-hectare park with over 200 kinds of trees, 500 kinds of plants and inhabited by many wild birds and insects.

According to a DIC management decision, partially attributed to shareholder pressure, the museum was initially planned to close on February 1, 2025, but due to public demand of Sakura residents, closure date was moved to March 31, 2025.

The collection, including the Rothko room, will relocate to an upcoming west wing of the International House of Japan in Tokyo planned to open in 2030.

== Public response ==
According to DIC corporation, the museum has had a positive impact on the image of the company. At the end of the 20th century, the museum was attracting over 300,000 visitors each year. Former president Shigekuni Kawamura commented that 'customers...evaluate us highly as a cultivated, international company which is not concerned solely with its business. This is not an outcome we planned, but is a very satisfying one'.

== Main works ==
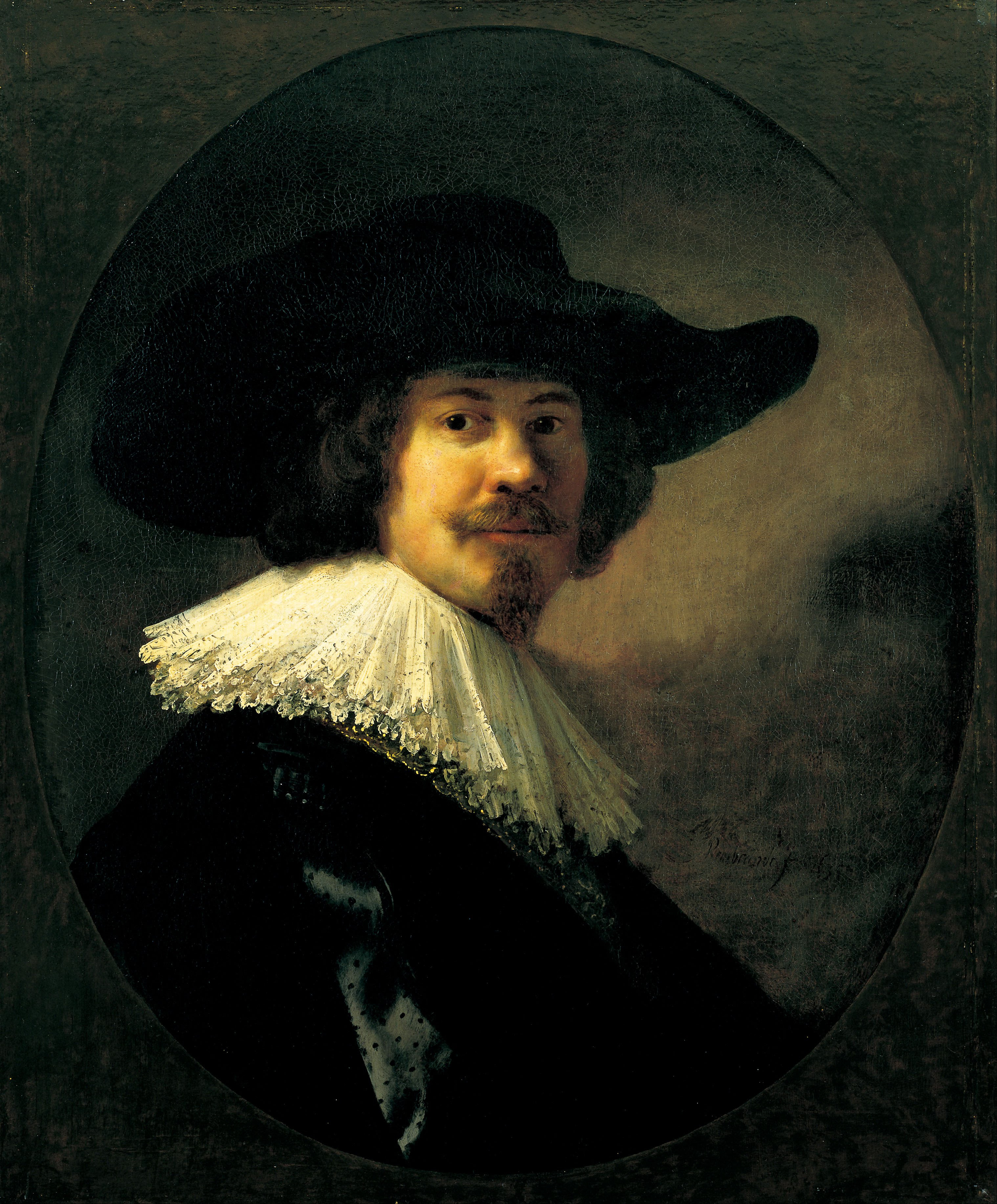
Rembrandt - Portrait of a Man in a Broad-Brimmed Hat (1635)

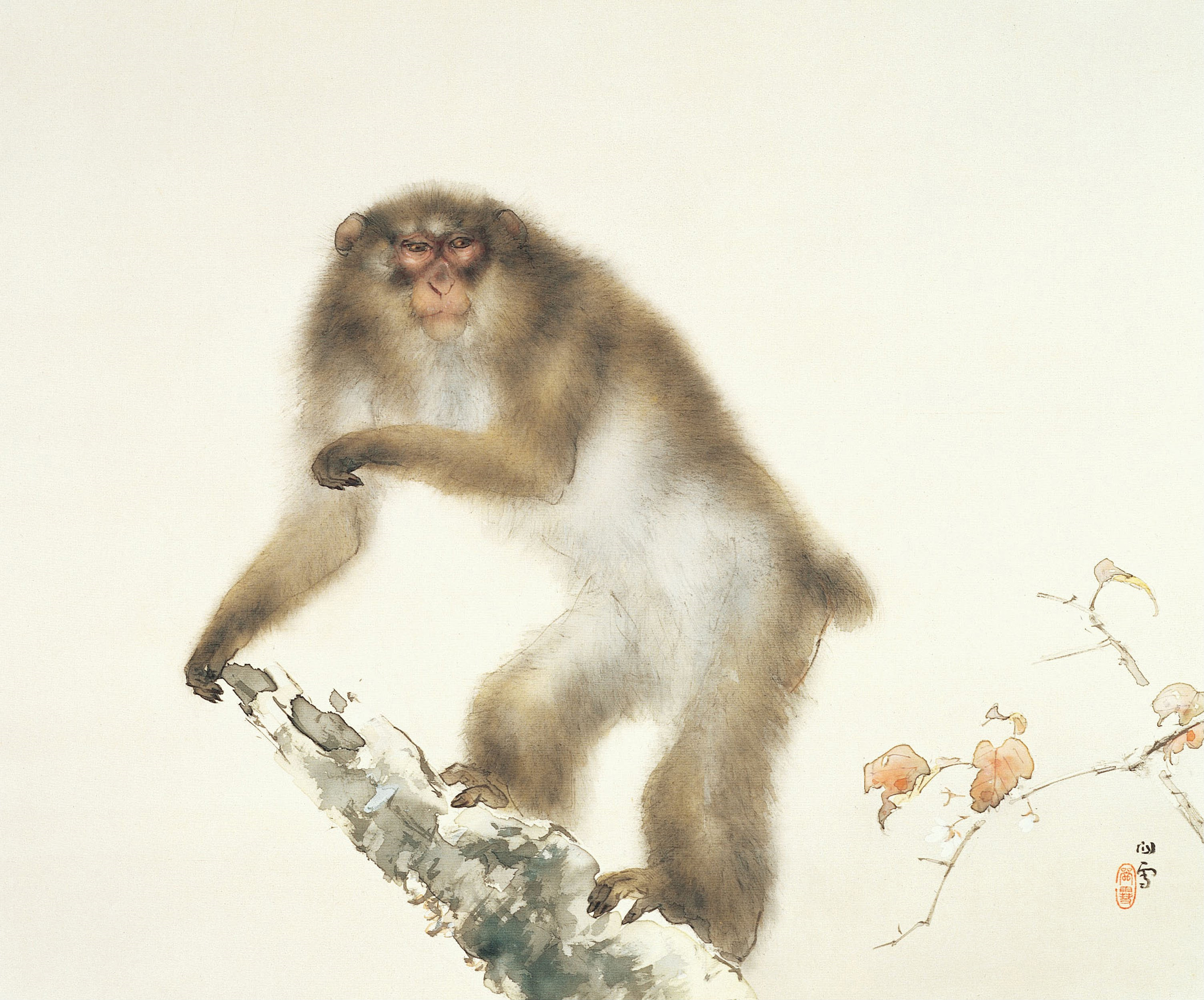
Hashimoto - Old Monkey with Cherry in Autumn (1938)
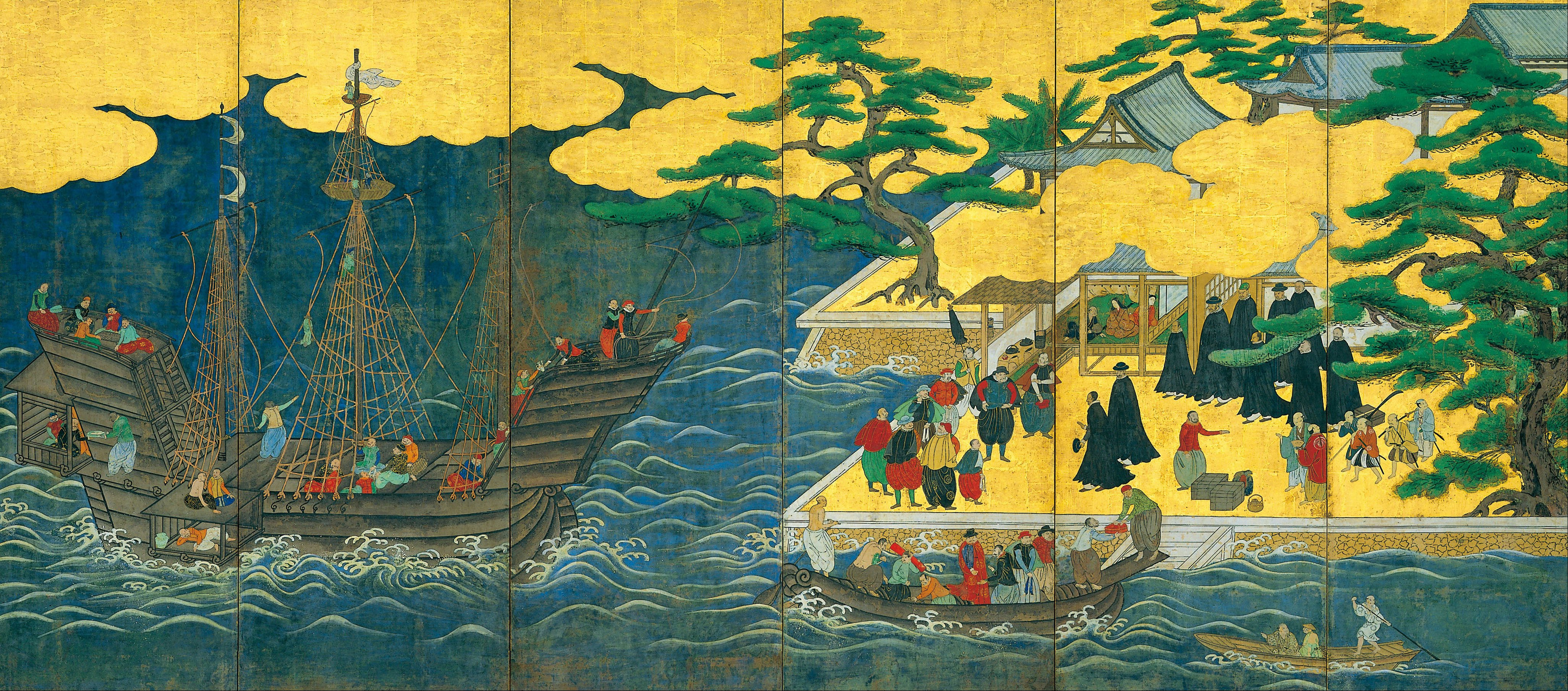
Namban Screen (1600)
