= Seagram murals =

Painting series by Mark Rothko

The Seagram Murals at the Tate Modern in London

The Seagram Murals are a series of large-scale paintings by abstract expressionist artist Mark Rothko.

The murals, characterized by their dark and somber palette, represented Rothko’s commitment to expressing the basic human emotions of tragedy, ecstasy, and doom while also showing a shift to his darker state of mind. His paintings use horizontal, vertical, and square formats to alter the viewer’s sense of space with reference to windows, doors, and portals.

The paintings were originally commissioned for the Four Seasons Restaurant in the Seagram Building of New York. Rothko worked on the series from 1958 to 1959 before eventually withdrawing from the project in 1960. Today the murals are split between London's Tate Gallery, Washington's National Gallery of Art, the Rothko family collections, and an upcoming room in Tokyo's International House of Japan.

== Context ==
As a leading artist in color-field painting, Rothko explored the spiritual and emotional dimensions of art to create experiences in what he described as the "scale of human feeling." In 1954, the Seagram Building was announced to be built and was allotted a $43 million design budget to symbolize economic prosperity and post-depression optimism for the future. As mural decorations were deemed necessary for the luxurious space of the Seagram Building, Rothko was quickly chosen as the ideal painter to provide paintings for the building’s high-end restaurant, the Four Seasons.

According to Philip Johnson, Rothko was given full permission to design the wall decorations "any way he chose." After visiting the location of his future artwork, Rothko stated that he hoped to "ruin the appetite of every son of a bitch who ever eats in that room."

== Description ==
According to Jeffrey S. Weiss, Rothko created three sets of panels which amounted to about forty-mural size canvases. Michael Compton and Thomas Kellein have established that Rothko likely intended to hang seven paintings, placing one painting on the space's south wall, three on the east wall, and three on the west wall. However, Rothko’s studio assistant, Dan Rice commented that it would be difficult to order the paintings as Rothko was constantly changing the sequence.

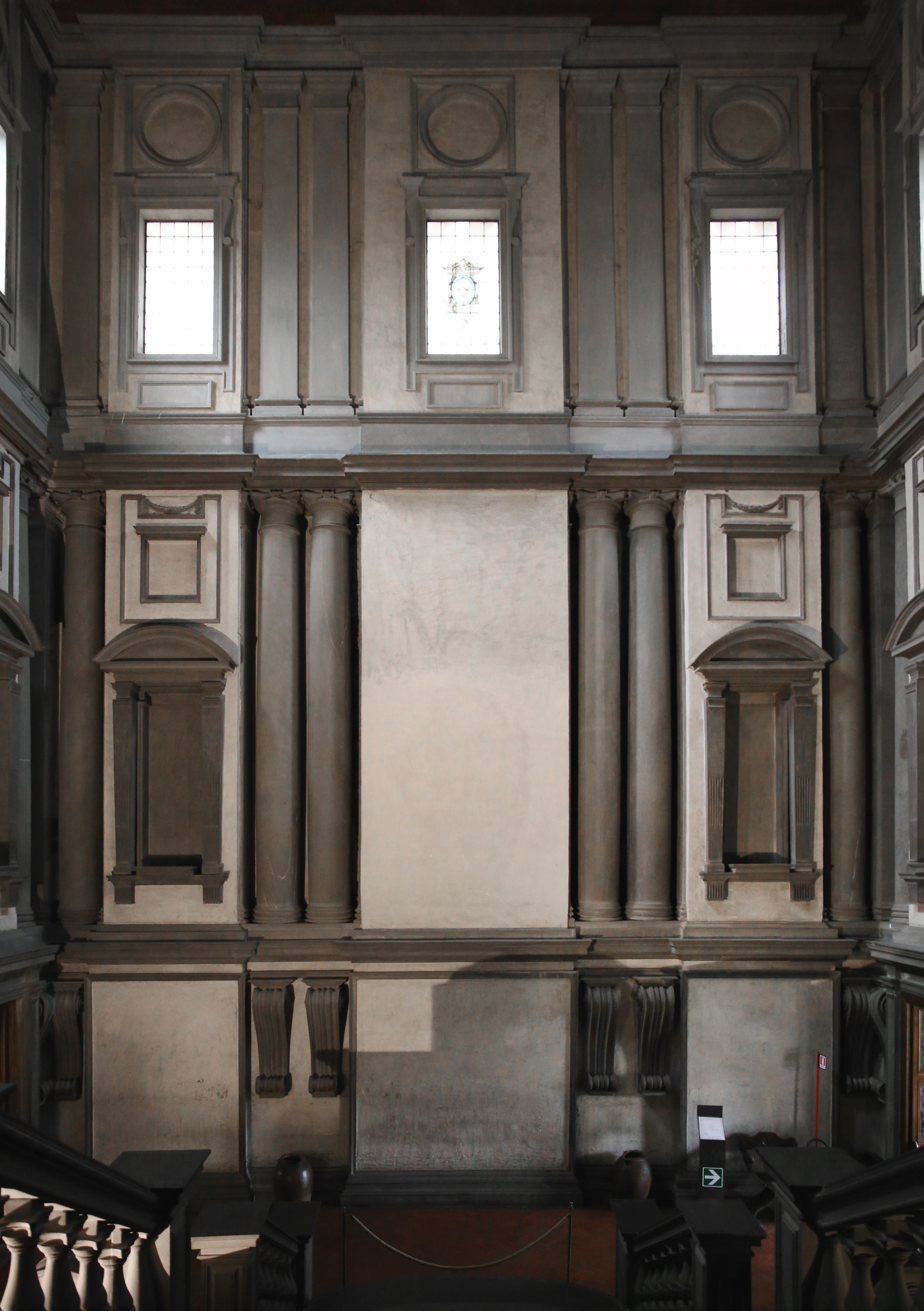
Michelangelo's Wall in the Medicean Library in Florence

Although the paintings are not explicitly distinguishable from other individual paintings sold by Rothko during this time, they are specially noted for their somber palette of maroons, dark reds, browns, and blacks that create an enveloping darkness. This was reported to be influenced by Michelangelo’s wall in the staircase room of the Medicean Library in Florence. Rothko stated that “He achieved just the kind of feeling I’m after - he makes the viewers feel that they are trapped in a room where all the doors and windows are bricked up, so that all they can do is butt their heads forever against the wall."

The murals were different from Rothko’s previous works as the Four Seasons was a commercial dining room. Rothko’s response to this type of space was to produce horizontal rectangles that were turned onto their sides to take up the appearance of open voids. For example, James Breslin has observed that the “brown and black rectangles resemble vertical columns, while the red area recedes, as if it were opening between them.” Rina Arya argues that while these forms were rectangular, they emerged as a new imagery of windows, doors, and portals that placed the viewer on the “threshold of an experience of opposites - presence and absence, fullness and emptiness.” Art historian David Anfam interjects that even though the Seagram murals were never displayed at the Four Seasons, Rothko's intention to have the viewers stare into "murky colored emptiness, around the framing structures that echo each other and across the breadth of a frieze-like, repetitive rhythm of portals and openings" was adamantly clear.

== Interpretation ==
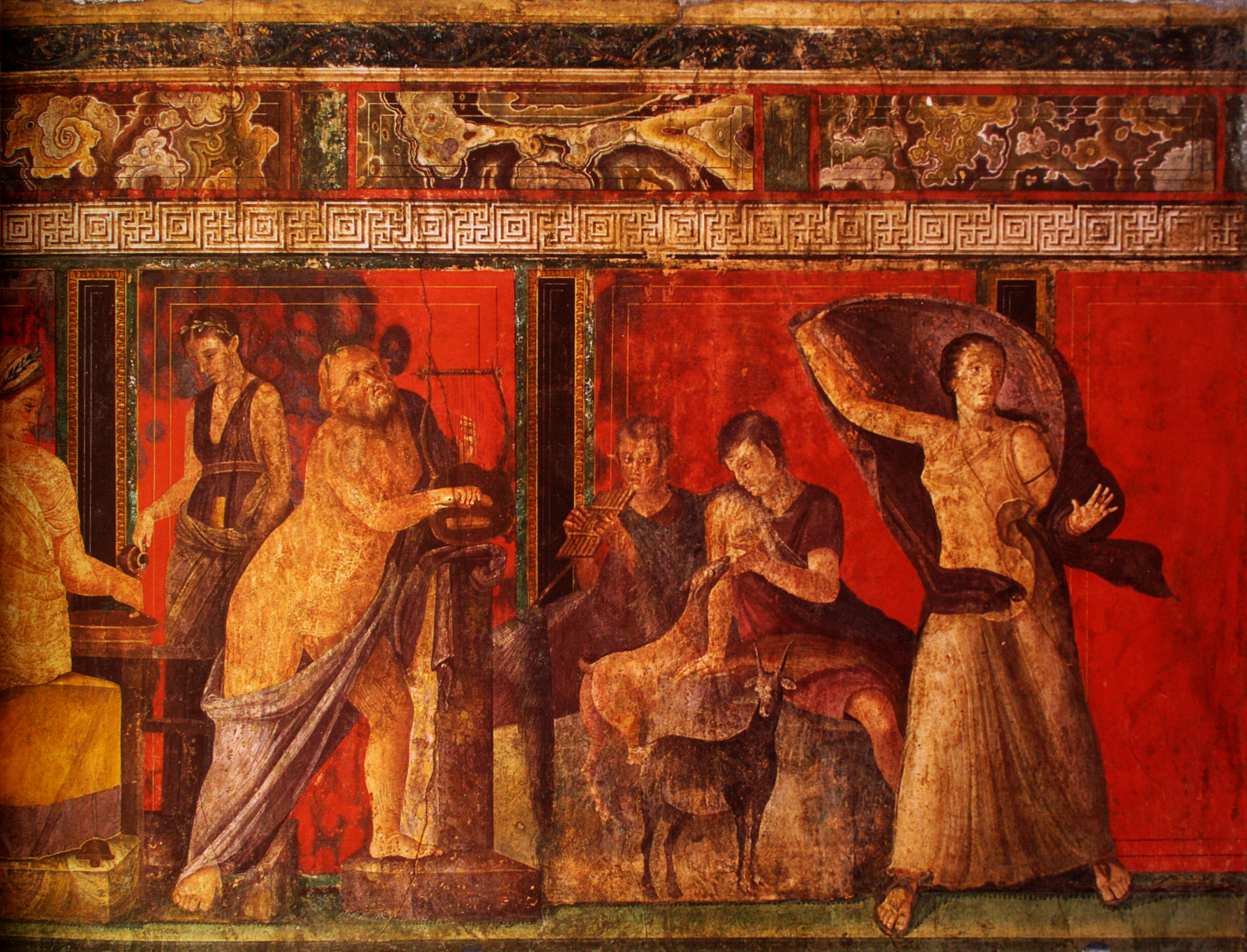
The Murals of the Villa of the Mysteries in Pompeii

Rina Arya noted that Rothko was intrigued by the fundamental aspects of mythology - “that is, violence and death” which she attributed to his exploration of human emotions and existential themes.

On his second trip to Europe in 1959, Rothko visited the murals of the Villa of the Mysteries in Pompeii. It was here that he sensed an affinity with his own project and the murals of the Villa of the Mysteries because they shared the “same broad expanses of somber color.”

Critics have stated that one of the most defining features of Rothko’s post-1950s work has been the conceptual value placed on the “meaningful.” Rothko's paintings are treated like ritualized objects where “each stage of the process - their creation, installation, and reception - is regarded as sacred.” This can speak to the level of control Rothko sought for since he believed murals do not just decorate a room, "but establish an environment that redefines the experience of an existing space, altering its expressive character."

After Rothko's death, some scholars saw the Seagram Murals as related to Rothko’s battle with severe depression and his declining health. In the viewpoint of James E. Breslin, the Seagram Murals represented a human presence that has endured the “tragic” history of the twentieth century, or rather, Rothko’s own tragedies. From the conflict in his marriage to the pressures that the Seagram commission placed on his professional success, his obsession to control the situation led to paintings where the enormous size of the canvas evoked the monumentality of a “portal…a site of physical movement and emotional crisis.” Ultimately, the works represent Rothko's own life as he migrated into a new social reality that was "producing more and more frustration."

== Exhibition ==
Rothko donated nine of the murals to London's Tate Gallery in 1969. The Tate Liverpool exhibited these with three additional from Rothko's estate in 1988 to recreate what would have shown in the restaurant.

Loaned from Rothko's estate, Pace Gallery showed ten of the second series murals in 1978. The Rothko Foundation donated six murals in 1985 to the Washington National Gallery of Art, which created a dedicated Rothko room "as intended" by the artist. The Kunsthalle Basel showed 30 of the murals.

As of 1998, the murals were split between London's Tate Gallery (nine), Japan's Kawamura Memorial Museum (seven), Washington's National Gallery of Art (13), and the Rothko family collections. With the Kawamura Museum's shutdown in 2025, the seven murals will be relocated to their own room in Tokyo's International House of Japan in 2030.

The National Gallery of Art exhibited the murals in Mark Rothko: Seagram Murals from December 6, 2011 - July 22, 2012. The exhibit included “… several paintings deriving from the so-called Seagram Mural project.”
